= Munich =

Capital of Bavaria, Germany

Munich München (German) Minga (Bavarian)
- City
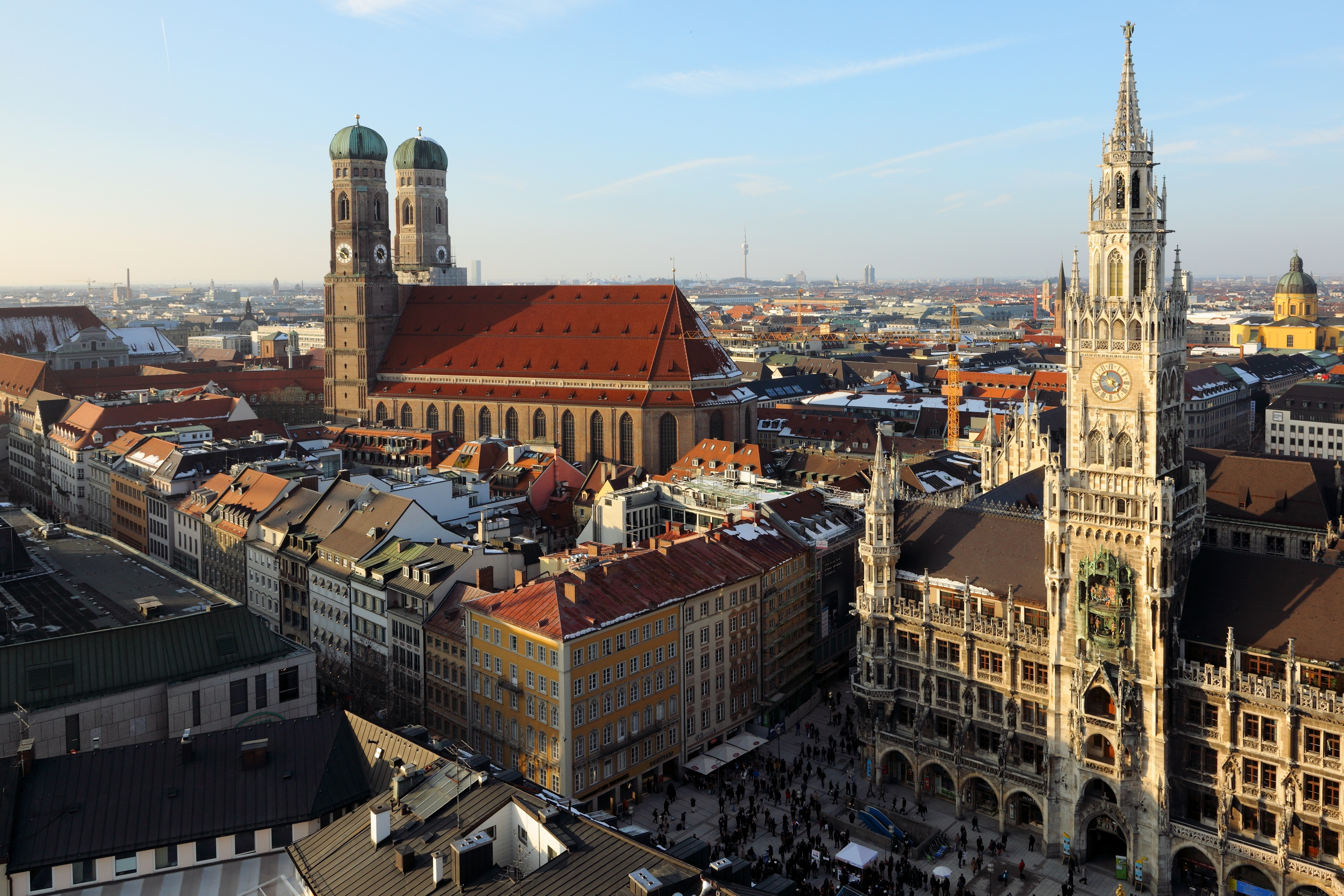
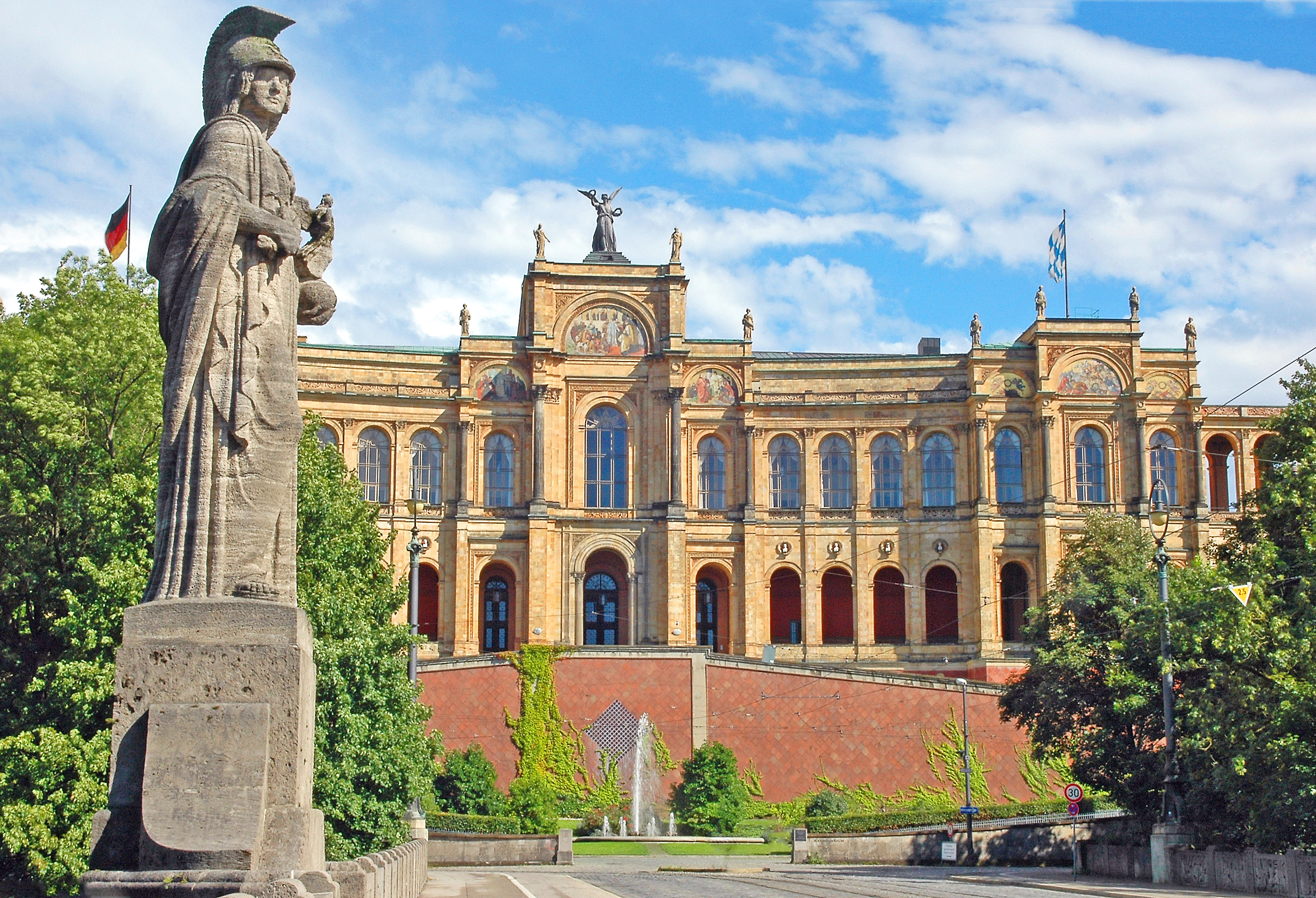
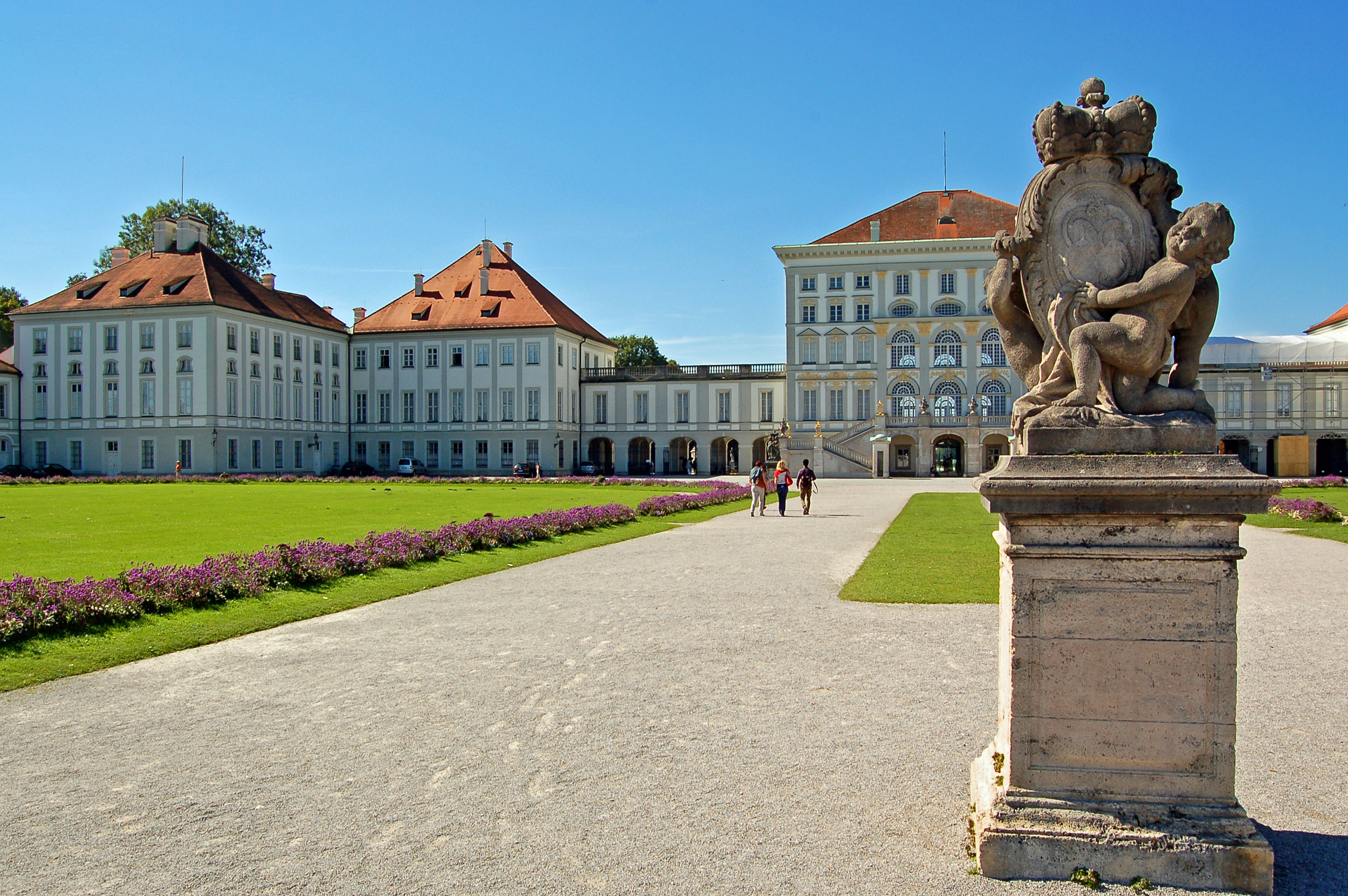
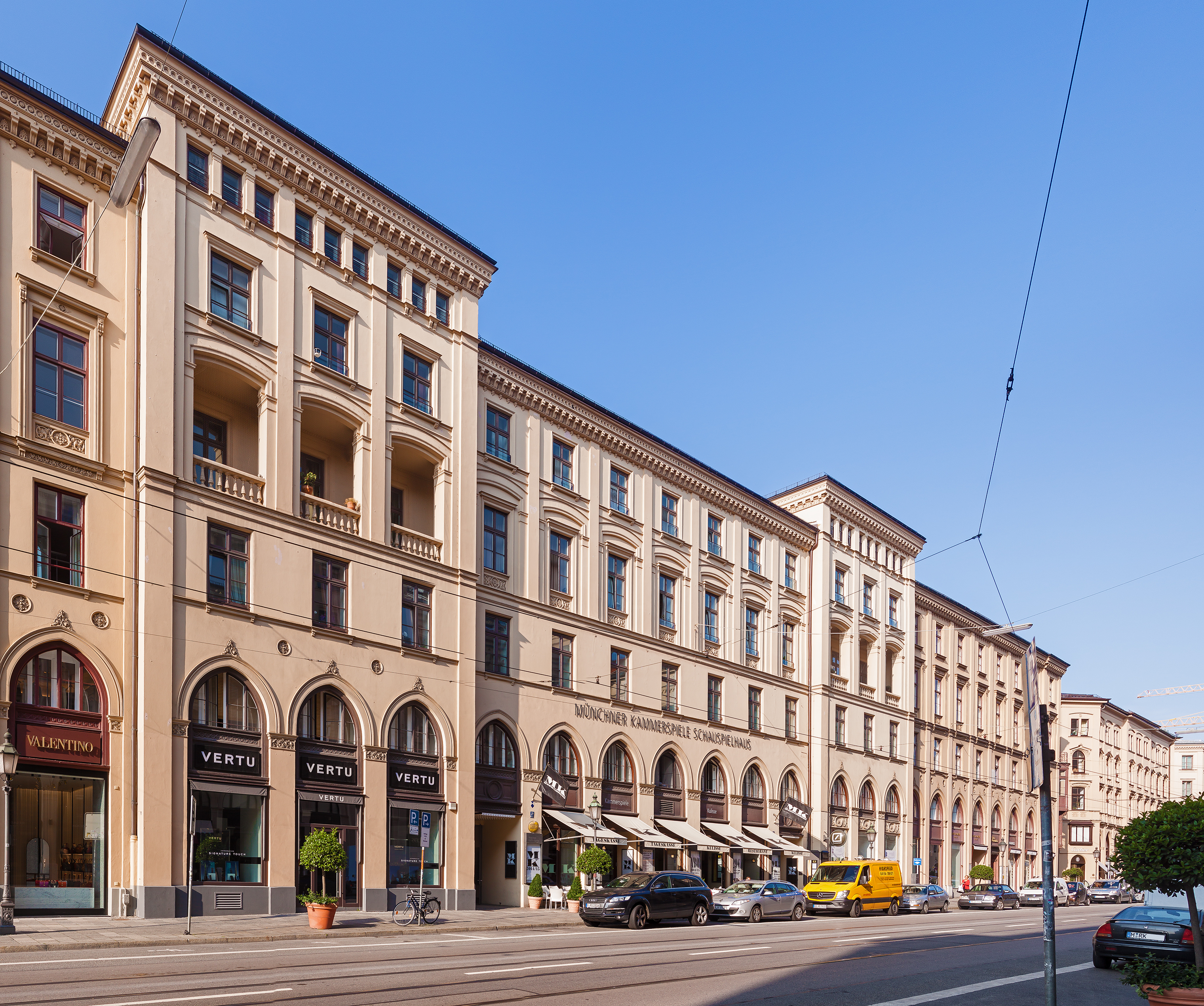
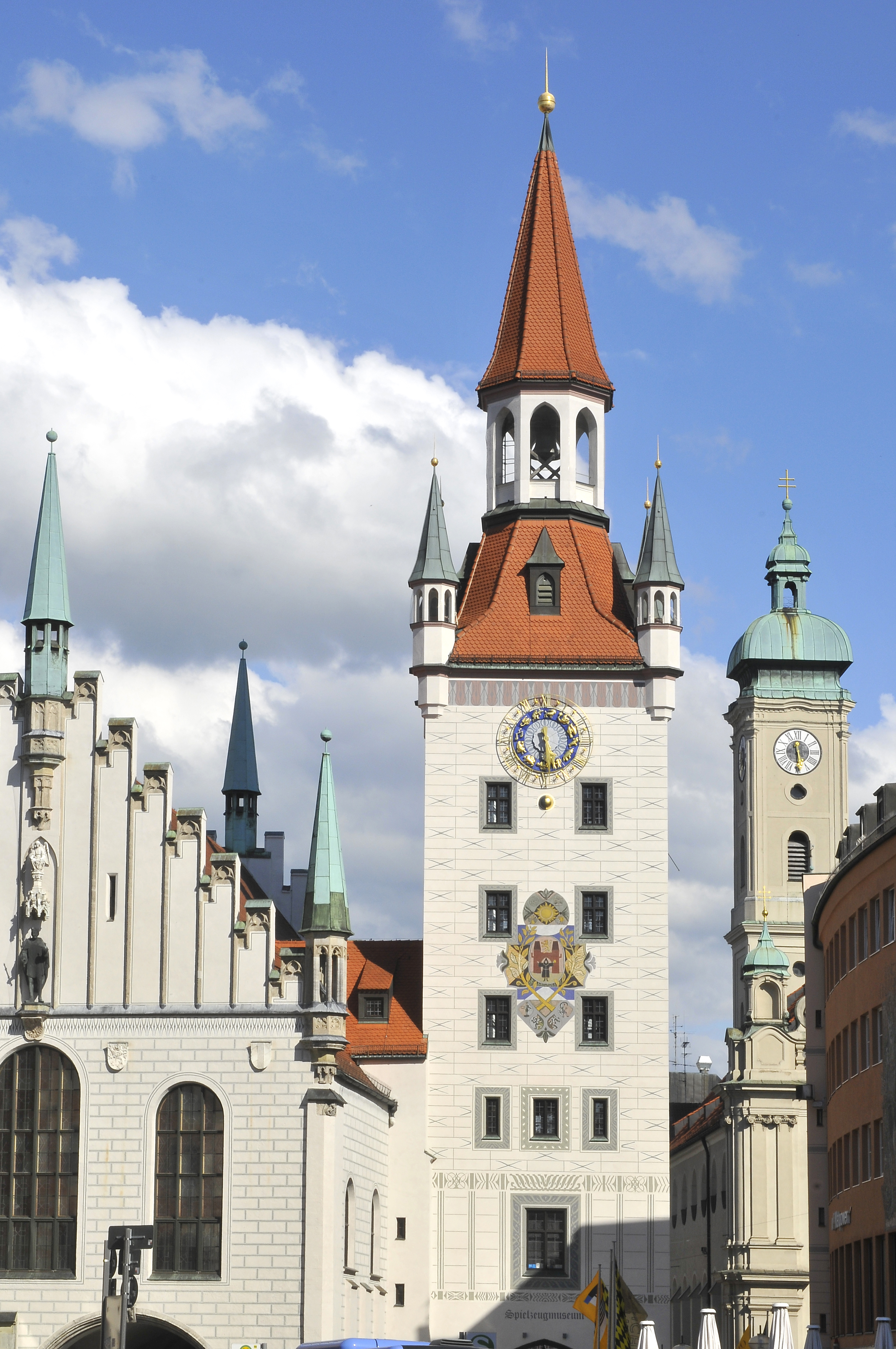
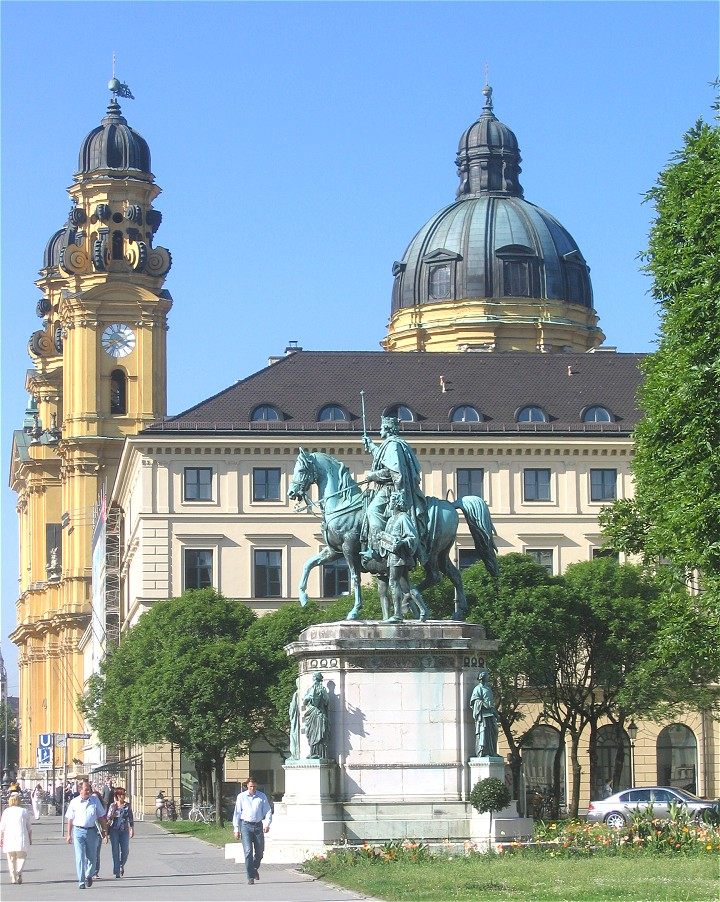
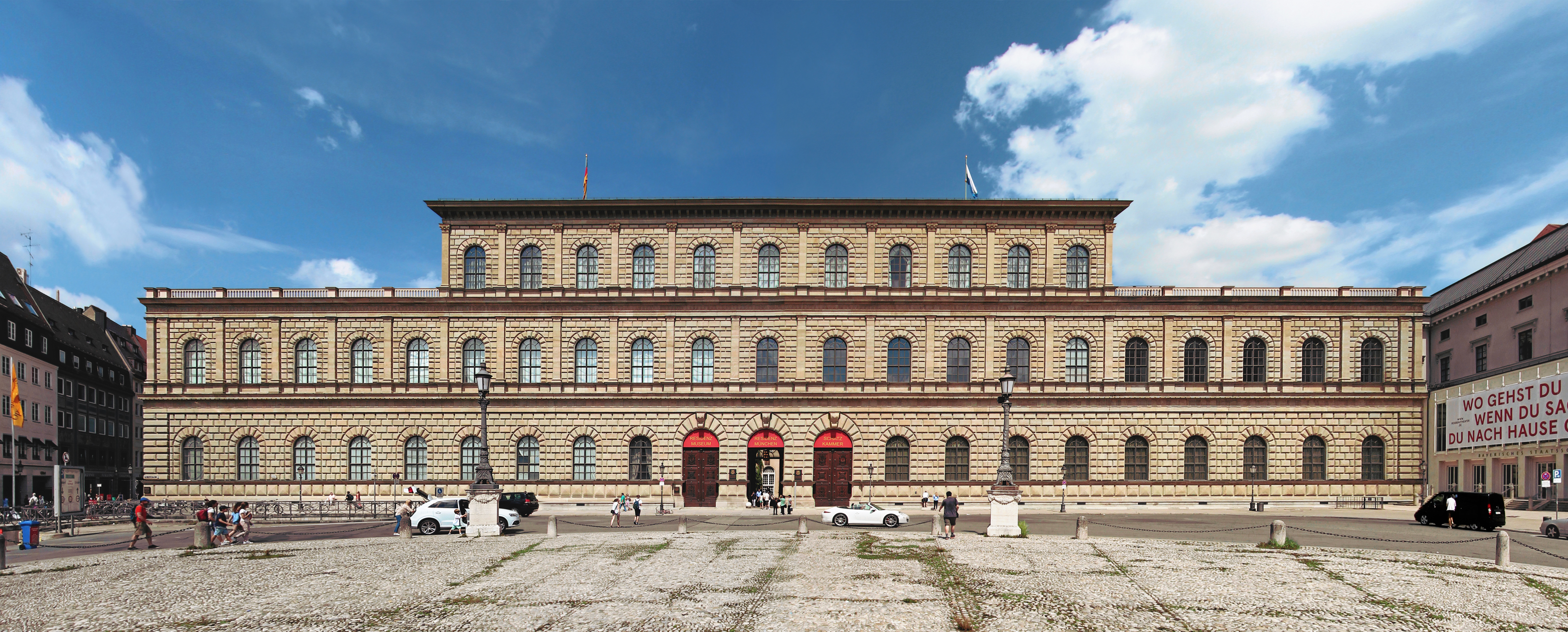
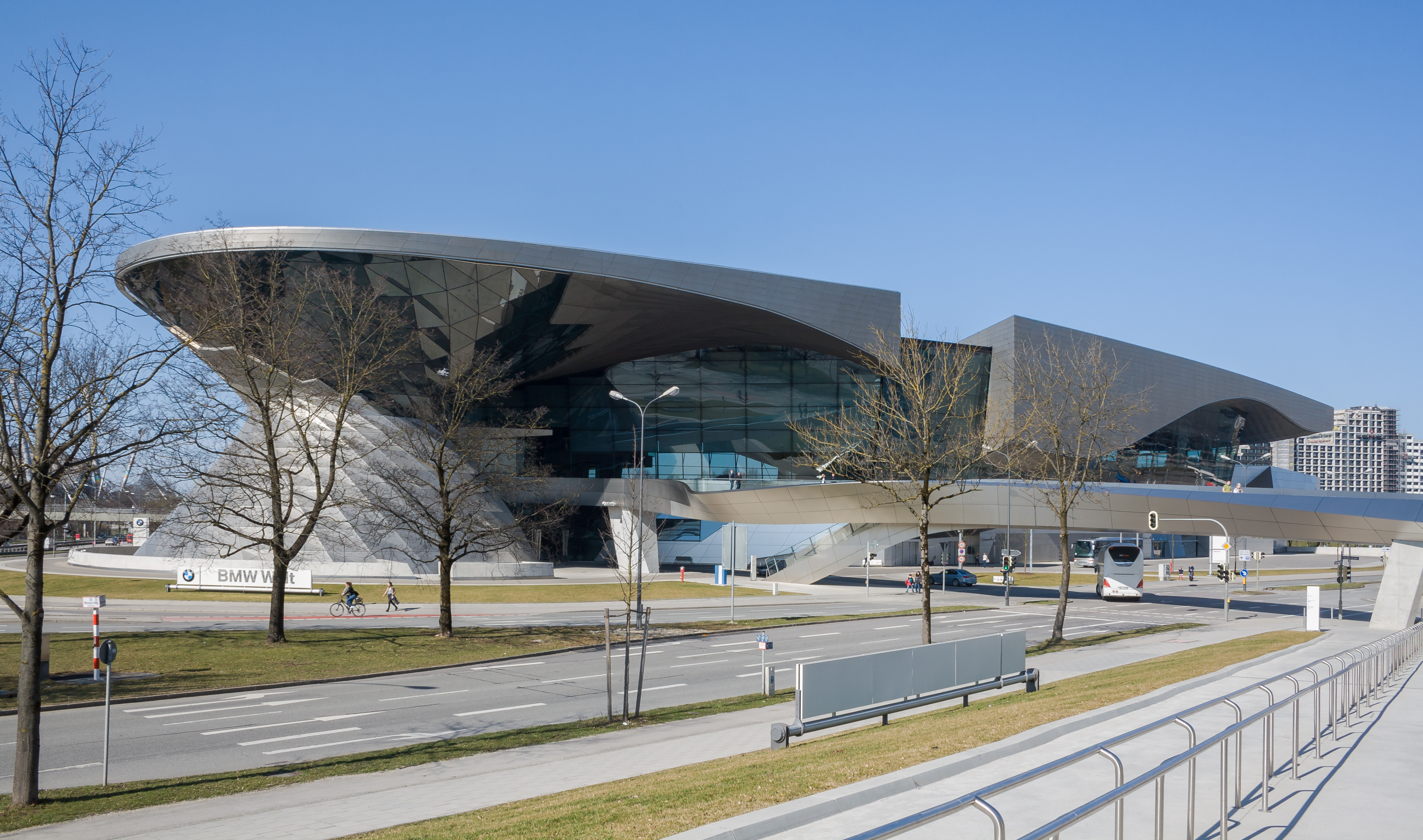
- Marienplatz with Neues Rathaus and Frauenkirche in the background Maximilianeum Nymphenburg Palace Maximilianstraße Talburgtor Theatine Church Munich Residenz BMW Welt

- Flag Coat of arms
- Interactive map of Munich
- Location within Germany Location within Bavaria
- Coordinates: 48°08′15″N 11°34′30″E
- Country: Germany
- State: Bavaria
- Admin. region: Upper Bavaria
- District: Urban district
- First mentioned: 1158
- Subdivisions: 25 boroughs: Altstadt-Lehel; Ludwigsvorstadt-Isarvorstadt; Maxvorstadt; Schwabing-West; Au-Haidhausen; Sendling; Sendling-Westpark; Schwanthalerhöhe; Neuhausen-Nymphenburg; Moosach; Milbertshofen-Am Hart; Schwabing-Freimann; Bogenhausen; Berg am Laim; Trudering-Riem; Ramersdorf-Perlach; Obergiesing; Untergiesing-Harlaching; Thalkirchen-Obersendling-Forstenried-Fürstenried-Solln; Hadern; Pasing-Obermenzing; Aubing-Lochhausen-Langwied; Allach-Untermenzing; Feldmoching-Hasenbergl; Laim

Government
  - Mayor (2026–32): Dominik Krause (Greens)
  - Governing parties: Greens/ SPD/ FDP/ FW/ Rosa Liste

Area
  - City: 310.71 km^{2} (119.97 sq mi)
- Elevation: 520 m (1,710 ft)

Population (2025-12-31)
  - City: 1,505,036
  - Density: 4,843.9/km^{2} (12,546/sq mi)
  - Urban: 2,606,021
  - Metro: 5,991,144
- Time zone: UTC+01:00 (CET)
  - Summer (DST): UTC+02:00 (CEST)
- Postal codes: 80331–81929
- Dialling codes: 089
- Vehicle registration: M, MUC
- Website: stadt.muenchen.de

Munich (Note: English: /ˈmjuːnɪk/ MEW-nik) (German: München [ˈmʏnçn̩]; Bavarian: Minga [ˈmɪŋ(ː)ɐ]) is the capital and most populous city of the German state of Bavaria. As of 31 December 2025, Munich had a population of 1,505,036 according to the Bavarian State Office for Statistics, making it the third most-populous city in Germany after Berlin and Hamburg. Munich is the largest city in Germany that is not a state of its own, and it ranks as the 11th-largest city in the European Union (EU). The metropolitan area has around 3 million inhabitants, and the broader Munich Metropolitan Region is home to about 6.2 million people. It is the third largest metropolitan region by GDP in the EU. Located on the Isar River near the Alps, it is the seat of the Upper Bavarian administrative region. With 4,800 people per km^{2}, Munich is Germany's most densely populated municipality and the second-largest city in the Bavarian dialect area after Vienna.

The first record of Munich dates to 1158. The city has played an important role in Bavarian and German history. During the Reformation, it remained Catholic. Munich became the capital of the Kingdom of Bavaria in 1806 and developed as an artistic and technological hub. The House of Wittelsbach ruled until 1918, when the German revolution of 1918–1919 ended their reign and saw the short-lived Bavarian Soviet Republic. In the 1920s, Munich became a centre of political movements, including the rise of the Nazi Party. The city was known as the "Capital of the Movement". During World War II, Munich was heavily bombed, but much of its historic architecture has since been restored. After the war, the city's population and economy grew rapidly. Munich hosted the 1972 Summer Olympics and the 1974 FIFA World Cup final.

Munich's economy is based on high tech, automobiles, the service sector, information technology, biotechnology, engineering, and electronics. Multinational companies such as BMW, Siemens, Allianz SE, and Munich Re are headquartered there. The city has two research universities and many scientific institutions. Munich is the wealthiest city in the EU by GDP per capita among cities with over one million inhabitants and is among the most expensive German cities for real estate and rents. The city is a major transport hub, with an extensive public transport network, long-distance railway connections, and Munich Airport, Germany's second-busiest airport.

Munich has a high standard of living, ranking first in Germany and third worldwide in the 2018 Mercer survey. It was named the world's most liveable city by Monocle's Quality of Life Survey 2018. In 2023, 30.1% of residents were foreigners, and 19.4% were German citizens with a migration background. Munich is known for its architecture, cultural venues, sports events, exhibitions, and the annual Oktoberfest, the world's largest Volksfest.

== History ==
=== Etymology ===
Munich was a tiny 10th-century monastic settlement, which was named zu den Munchen ("to the monks"). The Old High German Munche served as the base for the modern German city name München.

=== Early history ===
The river Isar was a prehistoric trade route and in the Bronze Age Munich was among the largest raft ports in Europe. Bronze Age settlements up to four millennia old have been discovered. Evidence of Celtic settlements from the Iron Age have been discovered in areas around Ramersdorf-Perlach.

The ancient Roman road Via Julia, which connected Augsburg and Salzburg, crossed over the Isar south of Munich, at the towns of Baierbrunn and Gauting. A Roman settlement north-east of Munich was excavated in the neighborhood of Denning.

Starting in the 6th century, the Baiuvarii populated the area around what is now modern Munich, such as in Johanneskirchen, Feldmoching, Bogenhausen and Pasing. The first known Christian church was built ca. 815 in Fröttmanning.

=== Middle Ages ===
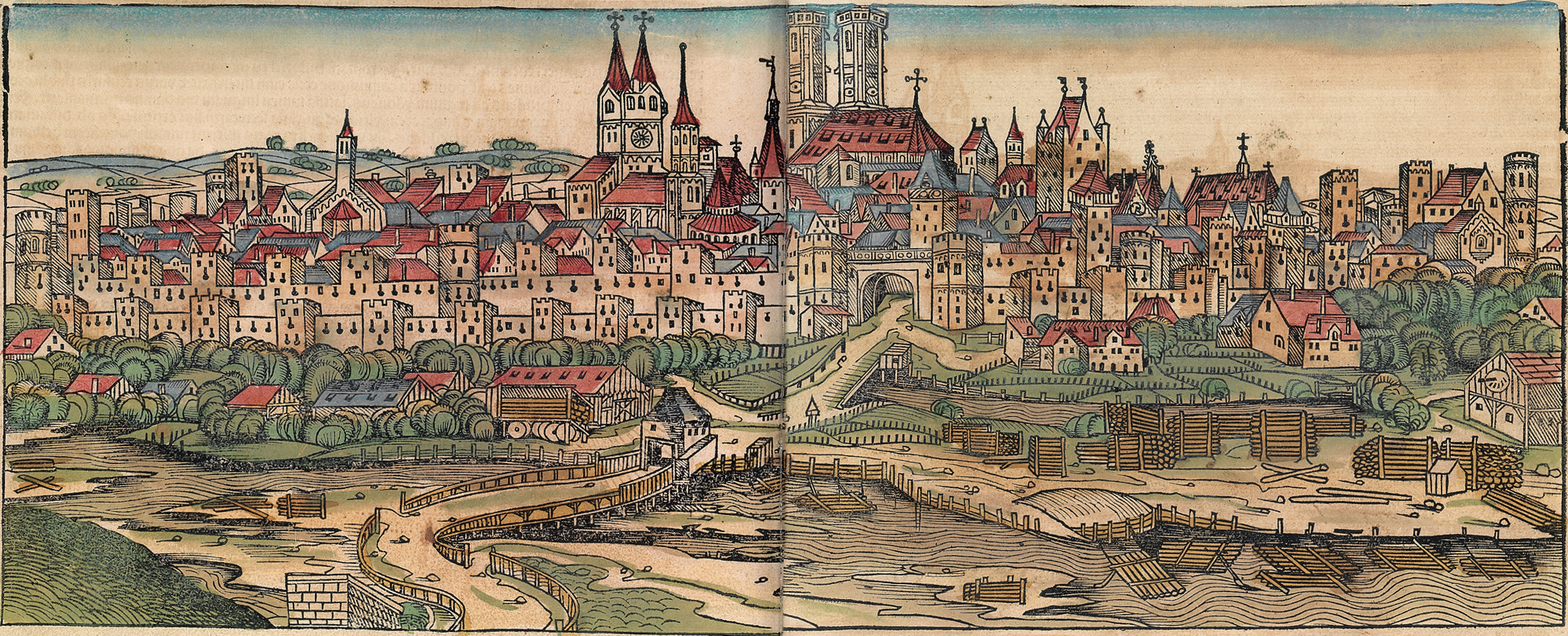
Munich in a 1493 woodcut from Hartmann Schedel's Nuremberg Chronicle

The first medieval bridges across the river Isar were located in current city areas of Munich and Landshut. Henry the Lion, the Duke of Saxony and Bavaria, founded the town of Munich in his territory to control the salt trade, after having burned down the town of Föhring and its bridges over the Isar. Historians date this event at about 1158.

Henry built a new toll bridge, customs house and a coin market closer to his home, somewhat upstream, at a settlement around the area of modern old town Munich. This new toll bridge most likely crossed the Isar where the Museuminsel and the modern Ludwigsbrücke are now located.

Otto of Freising protested to his nephew, Emperor Frederick Barbarossa. However, on 14 June 1158, in Augsburg, the conflict was settled in favor of Duke Henry. The Augsburg Arbitration mentions the name of the location in dispute as forum apud Munichen. Although Bishop Otto had lost his bridge, the arbiters ordered Duke Henry to pay a third of his income to the Bishop in Freising as compensation.

14 June 1158 is considered the official founding day of the city of Munich. Archaeological excavations at Marienhof Square (near Marienplatz) in advance of the expansion of the S-Bahn (subway) in 2012 discovered shards of vessels from the 11th century, which prove again that the settlement of Munich must be older than the Augsburg Arbitration of 1158. The old St. Peter's Church near Marienplatz is also believed to predate the founding date of the town.

In 1175, Munich received city status and fortification. In 1180, after Henry the Lion's fall from grace with Emperor Frederick Barbarossa, including his trial and exile, Otto I Wittelsbach became Duke of Bavaria, and Munich was handed to the Bishop of Freising. In 1240, Munich was transferred to Otto II Wittelsbach and in 1255, when the Duchy of Bavaria was split in two, Munich became the ducal residence of Upper Bavaria.

Duke Louis IV, a native of Munich, was elected German king in 1314 and crowned as Holy Roman Emperor in 1328. He strengthened the city's position by granting it the salt monopoly with staple rights, thus assuring it of additional income.

The growth of Munich was aided by its location on a gravel plain, where the Isar branched into multiple streams that in turn provided drinking water, defensive advantages, and power for many mills and industries within the city.

In the 15th century, Munich underwent a revival of Gothic arts: the Old Town Hall was enlarged, and Munich's largest Gothic church – the Frauenkirche – now a cathedral, was constructed in only 20 years, starting in 1468.

=== Capital of reunited Bavaria ===
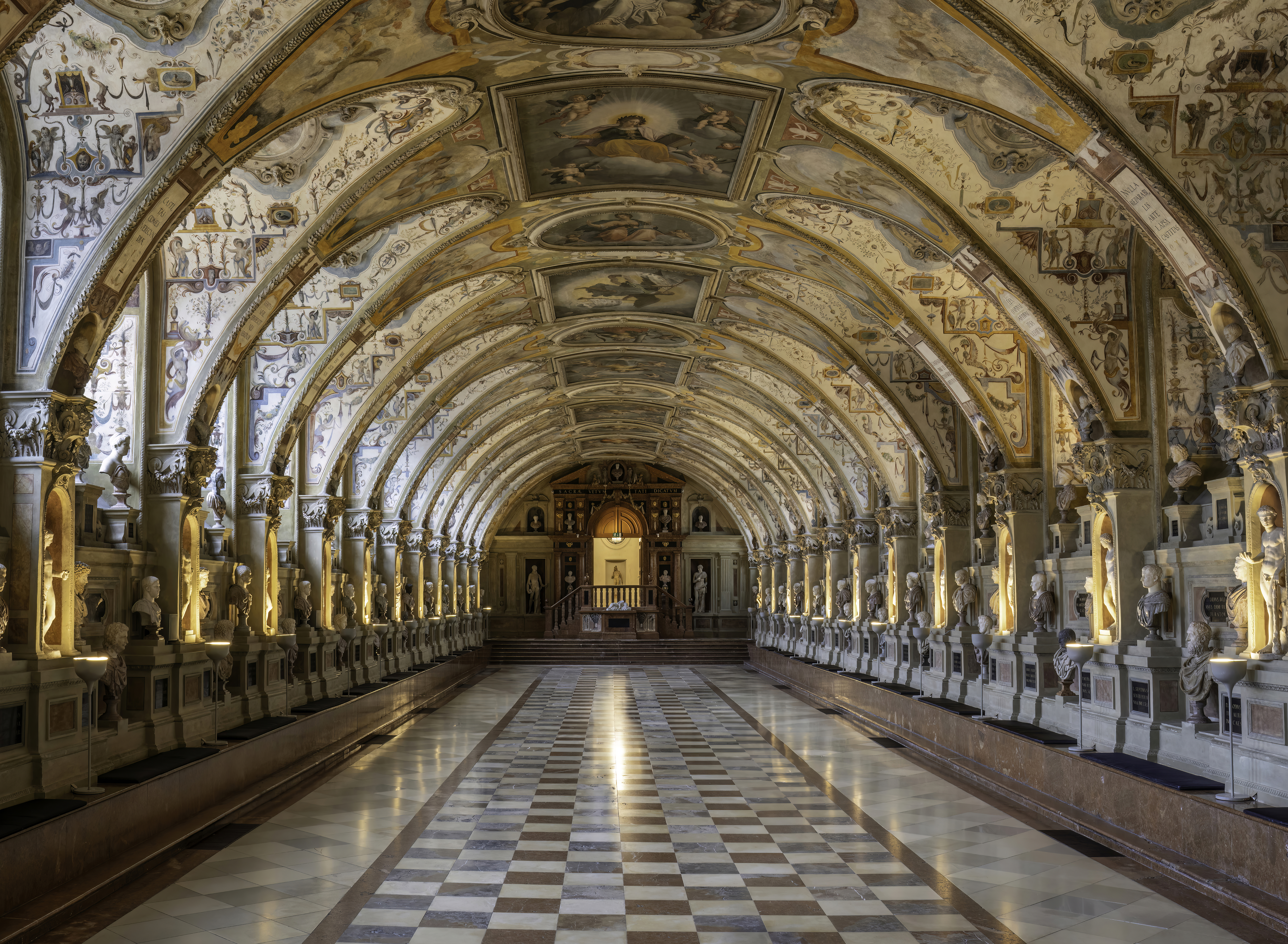
The Renaissance Antiquarium of the Munich Residenz

When Bavaria was reunited in 1506 after the War of the Succession of Landshut against the Duchy of Bavaria-Landshut, Munich became its capital. During the 16th century Munich became a stronghold of the Counter-Reformation. The Renaissance movement beset Munich and the Bavarian branch of the House of Wittelsbach under Duke Albrecht V who bolstered their prestige by conjuring up a lineage that reached back to classical antiquity. In 1568 Albrecht V built the Antiquarium to house the Wittelsbach collection of Greek and Roman antiquities in the Munich Residenz. Albrecht V appointed the composer Orlando di Lasso as director of the court orchestra and tempted numerous Italian musicians to work at the Munich court, establishing Munich as a hub for late Renaissance music. During the rule of Duke William V Munich began to be called the "German Rome" and William V began presenting Emperor Charlemagne as ancestor of the Wittelsbach dynasty.

Duke William V further cemented the Wittelsbach rule by commissioning the Jesuit Michaelskirche. He had the sermons of his Jesuit court preacher Jeremias Drexel translated from Latin into German and published them to a greater audience. William V was addressed with the epithet "the Pious" and like his contemporary Wittelsbach dukes promoted himself as "father of the land" (Landesvater), encouraged pilgrimages and Marian devotions. William V had the Hofbräuhaus built in 1589. It would become the prototype for beer halls across Munich.

The Catholic League was founded in Munich in 1609. In 1623, during the Thirty Years' War (1618–1648), Munich became an electoral residence when Duke Maximilian I was invested with the electoral dignity of the Holy Roman Empire, but in 1632 the city was occupied by King Gustavus Adolphus of Sweden. In 1634, Swedish and Spanish troops advanced on Munich. Maximilian I published a plague ordinance to halt an epidemic escalation. The bubonic plague nevertheless ravaged Munich and the surrounding countryside in 1634 and 1635. Troops again converged on Munich in 1647 and precautions were taken, so as to avoid another epidemic. The city remained physically untouched during the war.

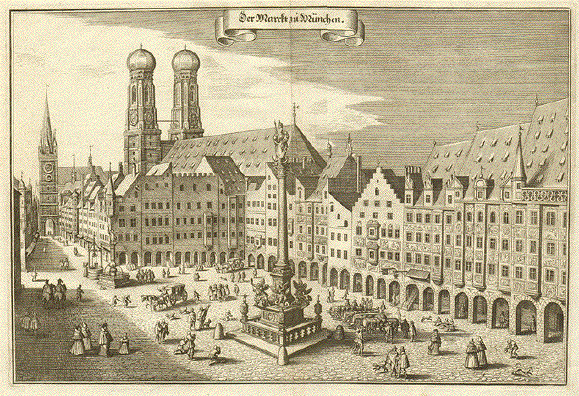
Marienplatz, c. 1650

During its time as the capital of the Electorate of Bavaria, Munich was an important centre of Baroque life, but also had to suffer under Habsburg occupations in 1704 after Bavaria's defeat in the War of the Spanish Succession and again in 1742 during the War of the Austrian Succession. When Elector Maximilian III Joseph died in 1777, the succession empowered the Palatinate branch within the House of Wittelsbach. In 1785, Elector Karl Theodor invited Count Rumford (Benjamin Thompson) to Munich to implement social reforms, including workhouses for the poor and army restructuring with improved conditions for soldiers. In the 1790s, Munich became the largest German city to remove its fortifications, starting in 1791 under Karl Theodor and Rumford. After 1793, citizens built new structures outside the former city walls.

After making an alliance with Napoleonic France, the city became the capital of the new Kingdom of Bavaria in 1806 with Elector Maximilian IV Joseph becoming its first king. The state parliament (the Landtag) and the new archdiocese of Munich and Freising were also located in the city.

The establishment of Bavarian state sovereignty made Munich the centre of a modernising kingdom. In 1802, King Maximilian Joseph secularised Bavaria, dissolving monasteries and selling church lands to generate state revenue. He also took control of the right to brew beer, granting a monopoly to Munich's wealthiest brewers in exchange for substantial taxes. In 1807, he abolished restrictions on the number of brewery workers, allowing brewers to meet growing demand.

In October 1810, a beer festival was held on the meadows outside Munich to celebrate the crown prince's wedding to Princess Therese of Saxe-Hildburghausen. The event, featuring parades in regional dress, later evolved into the annual Oktoberfest, now held at Theresienwiese.

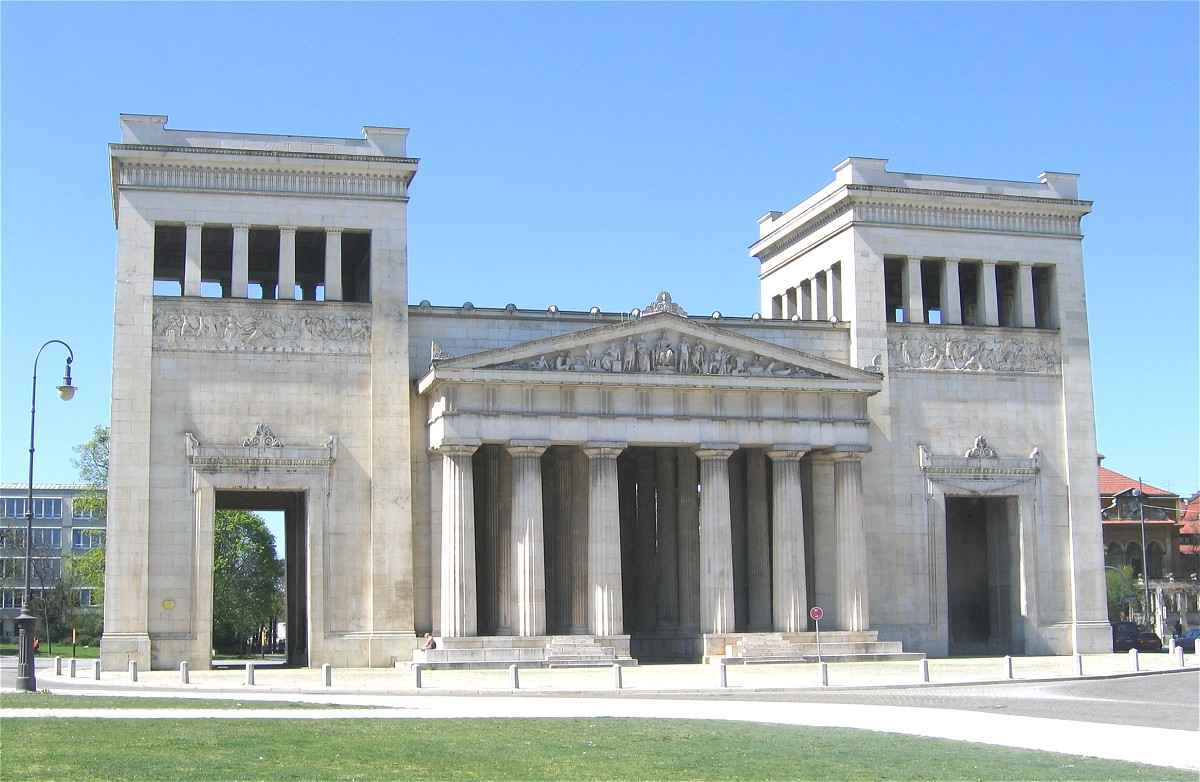
Neoclassical buildings erected under Ludwig I, such as the Propylaea, earned Munich the nickname 'Athens on the Isar'.

The first Munich railway station was built in 1839, with a line going to Augsburg in the west. By 1849 a newer Munich Central Train Station (München Hauptbahnhof) was completed, with a line going to Landshut and Regensburg in the north. In 1825 Ludwig I had ascended to the throne and commissioned leading architects such as Leo von Klenze to design a series of public museums in neoclassical style. Between 1856 and 1861 the court gardener Carl von Effner landscaped the banks of the river Isar and established the Maximilian Gardens. Leo von Klenze supervised the construction of the Propylaea between 1854 and 1862. In 1857 the construction of the Maximilianeum was begun. The grand building projects of Ludwig I gave Munich the endearment "Athens on the Isar" (German: Isar-Athen) and "Monaco di Bavaria".

By the time Ludwig II became king in 1864, he remained mostly aloof from his capital and focused more on his fanciful castles in the Bavarian countryside. In 1876 Munich hosted the first German Art and Industry Exhibition, which showcased the northern Neo-Renaissance fashion that came to be the German Empire's predominant style. Munich based artists put on the German National Applied Arts Exhibition in 1888, showcasing Baroque Revival architecture and Rococo Revival designs.

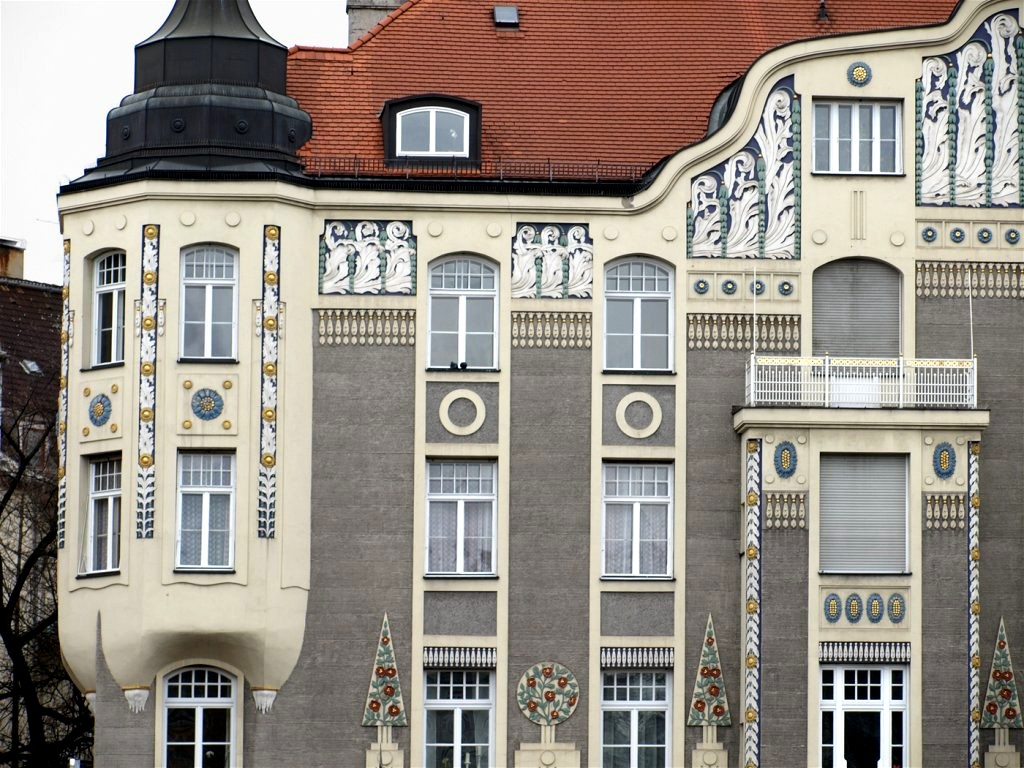
Jugendstil style house at Leopoldstr. 77. At the beginning of the 20th century, Munich was a hub for the Jugendstil movement.

The Prince Regent Luitpold's reign from 1886 to 1912 was marked by tremendous artistic and cultural activity in Munich. At the dawn of the 20th century Munich was an epicenter for the Jugendstil movement, combining a liberal magazine culture with progressive industrial design and architecture. The German art movement took its name from the Munich magazine Die Jugend (The Youth). Prominent Munich Jugendstil artists include Hans Eduard von Berlepsch-Valendas, Otto Eckmann, Margarethe von Brauchitsch, August Endell, Hermann Obrist, Wilhelm von Debschitz, and Richard Riemerschmid. In 1905 two large department stores opened in Munich, the Kaufhaus Oberpollinger and the Warenhaus Hermann Tietz, both having been designed by the architect Max Littmann. In 1911 the expressionist group Der Blaue Reiter was established in Munich. Its founding members include Gabriele Münter.

=== World War I to World War II ===
Following the outbreak of World War I in 1914, life in Munich became very difficult, as the Allied blockade of Germany led to food and fuel shortages. During a French air raid in 1916, three bombs fell on Munich.

In 1916, the 'Bayerische Motoren Werke' (BMW) produced its first aircraft engine in Munich. The public limited company BMW AG was founded in 1918, with Camillo Castiglioni owning one third of the share capital. In 1922 BMW relocated its headquarters to a factory in Munich.

After World War I, the city was at the centre of substantial political unrest. In November 1918, on the eve of the German revolution, Ludwig III of Bavaria and his family fled the city. After the murder of the first republican premier of Bavaria Kurt Eisner in February 1919 by Anton Graf von Arco auf Valley, the Bavarian Soviet Republic was proclaimed. The November 1918 revolution ended the reign of the Wittelsbach in Bavaria. In Mein Kampf Adolf Hitler described his political activism in Munich after November 1918 as the "Beginning of My Political Activity". Hitler called the short-lived Bavarian Soviet Republic "the rule of the Jews".

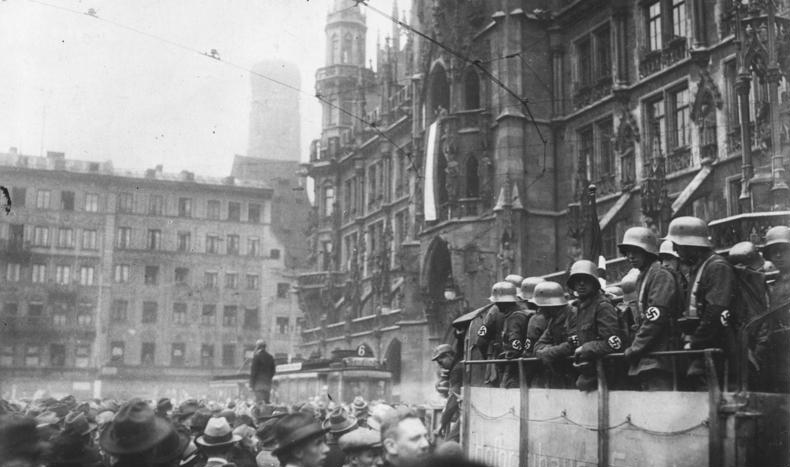
Unrest during the 1923 Beer Hall Putsch, a failed coup d'état led by Adolf Hitler, Erich Ludendorff, and other Kampfbund leaders

In 1923 Gustav von Kahr was appointed Bavarian prime minister and immediately planned for the expulsion of all Jews who did not hold German citizenship. Chief of Police Ernst Pöhner and Wilhelm Frick openly indulged in antisemitism, while Bavarian judges praised people on the political right as patriotic for their crimes and handed down mild sentences. In 1923, Adolf Hitler and his supporters, who were concentrated in Munich, staged the Beer Hall Putsch, an attempt to overthrow the Weimar Republic and seize power. The revolt failed, resulting in Hitler's arrest and the temporary crippling of the Nazi Party (NSDAP).

The unofficial city anthem of Munich, recorded in 1929

Munich was chosen as capital for the Free State of Bavaria and acquired increased responsibility for administering the city itself and the surrounding districts. Offices needed to be built for bureaucracy, so a 12-story office building was erected in the southern part of the historic city centre in the late 1920s.

Munich again became important to the Nazis when they took power in Germany in 1933. The party created its first concentration camp at Dachau, 16 km (10 mi) north-west of the city. Because of its importance to the rise of National Socialism, Munich was referred to as the Hauptstadt der Bewegung ("Capital of the Movement").

The NSDAP headquarters and the documentation apparatus for controlling all aspects of life were located in Munich. Nazi organizations, such as the National Socialist Women's League and the Gestapo, had their offices along Brienner Straße and around the Königsplatz. The party acquired 68 buildings in the area and many Führerbauten ("Führer buildings") were built to reflect a new aesthetic of power. Construction work for the Führerbau and the party headquarters (known as the Brown House) started in September 1933. The Haus der Kunst (House of German Art) was the first building to be commissioned by Hitler. The architect Paul Troost was asked to start work shortly after the Nazis had seized power because "the most German of all German cities" was left with no exhibition building when in 1931 the Glass Palace was destroyed in an arson attack.

The city was the site where the 1938 Munich Agreement was signed between Nazi Germany, the United Kingdom, France and Italy. On 8 November 1939, shortly after the Second World War had begun, Georg Elser planted a bomb in the Bürgerbräukeller in Munich in an attempt to assassinate Adolf Hitler, who held a political party speech. Hitler, however, had left the building minutes before the bomb went off.

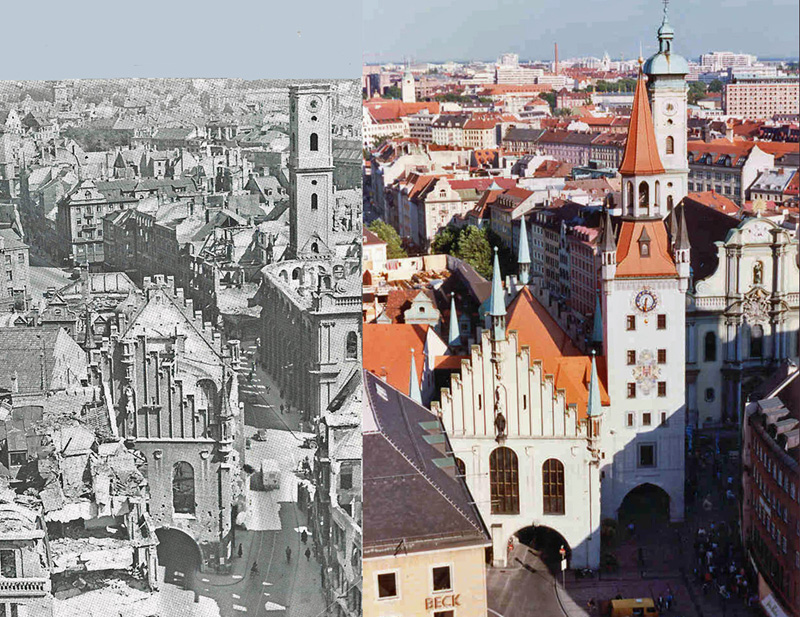
View of Munich city centre in 1945 after the devastation of World War II, and in 1989 after reconstruction, featuring the restored Old Town Hall, Talburgtor, and Heilig-Geist-Kirche

During the war, Munich was the location of multiple forced labour camps, including two Polenlager camps for Polish youth, and 40 subcamps of the Dachau concentration camp, in which men and women of various nationalities were held. With up to 17,000 prisoners in 1945, the largest subcamp of Dachau was the Munich-Allach concentration camp. By mid 1942 the majority of Jews living in Munich and the suburbs had been deported.

Munich was the base of the White Rose, a student resistance movement. The core members were arrested and executed after Sophie Scholl and her brother Hans Scholl were caught distributing leaflets on the campus of the Ludwig-Maximilians-Universität München, calling upon the youth to rise against Hitler.

Around 50% of city were heavily damaged by the bombing of Munich in World War II, with 71 air raids over five years. After the war, large reconstruction projects restored most of the historically relevant buildings in the old town, that had suffered damage. US troops captured Munich on 30 April 1945.

=== Postwar ===
In the aftermath of World War II, Germany was subject to US Military occupation. Due to Polish annexation of the former eastern territories of Germany and expulsion of Germans from all over Eastern Europe, Munich operated over a thousand refugee camps for 151,113 people in October 1946. After US occupation Munich was completely rebuilt following a meticulous plan, which preserved its pre-war street grid, bar a few exceptions owing to then-modern traffic concepts. In 1957, Munich's population surpassed one million. The city continued to play a highly significant role in the West German economy, politics and culture, giving rise to its nickname Heimliche Hauptstadt ("secret capital") in the decades after World War II.

The Free State of Bavaria used the arms industry as kernel for its high tech development policy. Since 1963, Munich has been hosting the Munich Security Conference, a conference on international security policy held annually in the Hotel Bayerischer Hof. Munich also became known on the political level due to the strong influence of Bavarian politician Franz Josef Strauss from the 1960s to the 1980s. The Munich Airport, which commenced operations in 1992, was named in his honor.

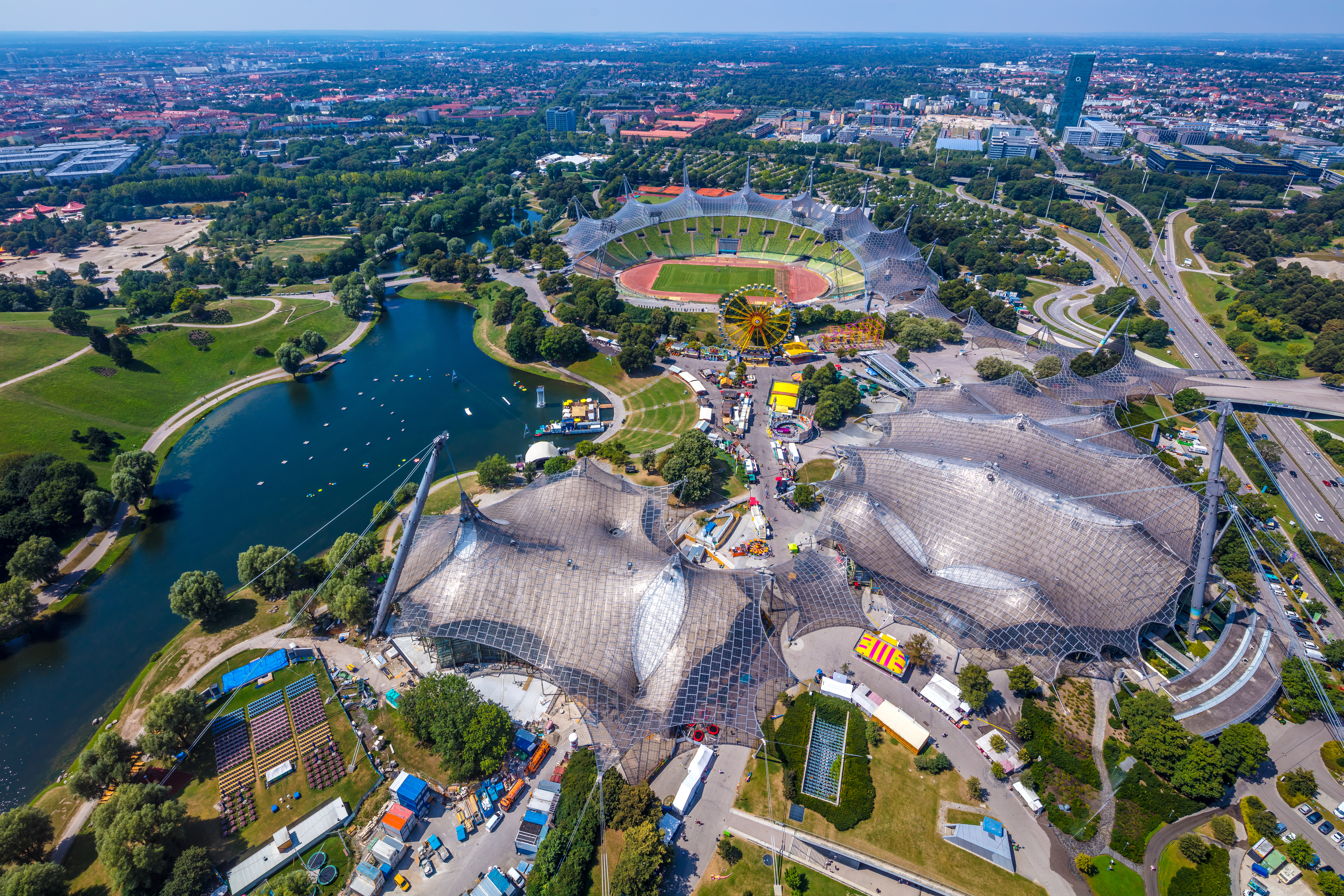
Olympiapark was the main venue for the 1972 Olympic Games and also hosted the 1974 FIFA World Cup final.

Munich hosted the 1972 Summer Olympics. After winning the bid in 1966 the Mayor of Munich, Hans-Jochen Vogel, accelerated the construction of the U-Bahn subway and the S-Bahn metropolitan commuter railway. In May 1967 the construction work began for a new U-Bahn line connecting the city with the Olympic Park (Olympiapark). The Olympic Park subway station was built near the BMW Headquarters and the line was completed in May 1972, three months before the opening of the 1972 Summer Olympics. Shortly before the opening ceremony, Munich also inaugurated a sizable pedestrian priority zone between Karlsplatz and Marienplatz. In 1970 the Munich city council released funds so that the gothic facade and Glockenspiel of the New City Hall (Neues Rathaus) could be restored. During the 1972 Summer Olympics 11 Israeli athletes were murdered by Palestinian terrorists in the Munich massacre, when gunmen from the Palestinian "Black September" group took hostage members of the Israeli Olympic team. In 1974, the FIFA World Cup final was held at the Olympic Stadium.

Munich and its urban sprawl emerged as the leading German high tech region during the 1980s and 1990s. The urban economy of Munich became characterized by a dynamic labour market, low unemployment, a growing service economy and high per capita income.

Munich was one of the host cities for the 2006 FIFA World Cup and both the UEFA Euro 2020 – postponed by a year because of the COVID-19 pandemic – and UEFA Euro 2024.

== Geography ==
=== Topography ===
Munich lies on the elevated plains of Upper Bavaria in the Northern Alpine Foreland, about 50 km north of the Alps and at about 520 m above mean sea level. The rivers Isar and Würm flow through the city.

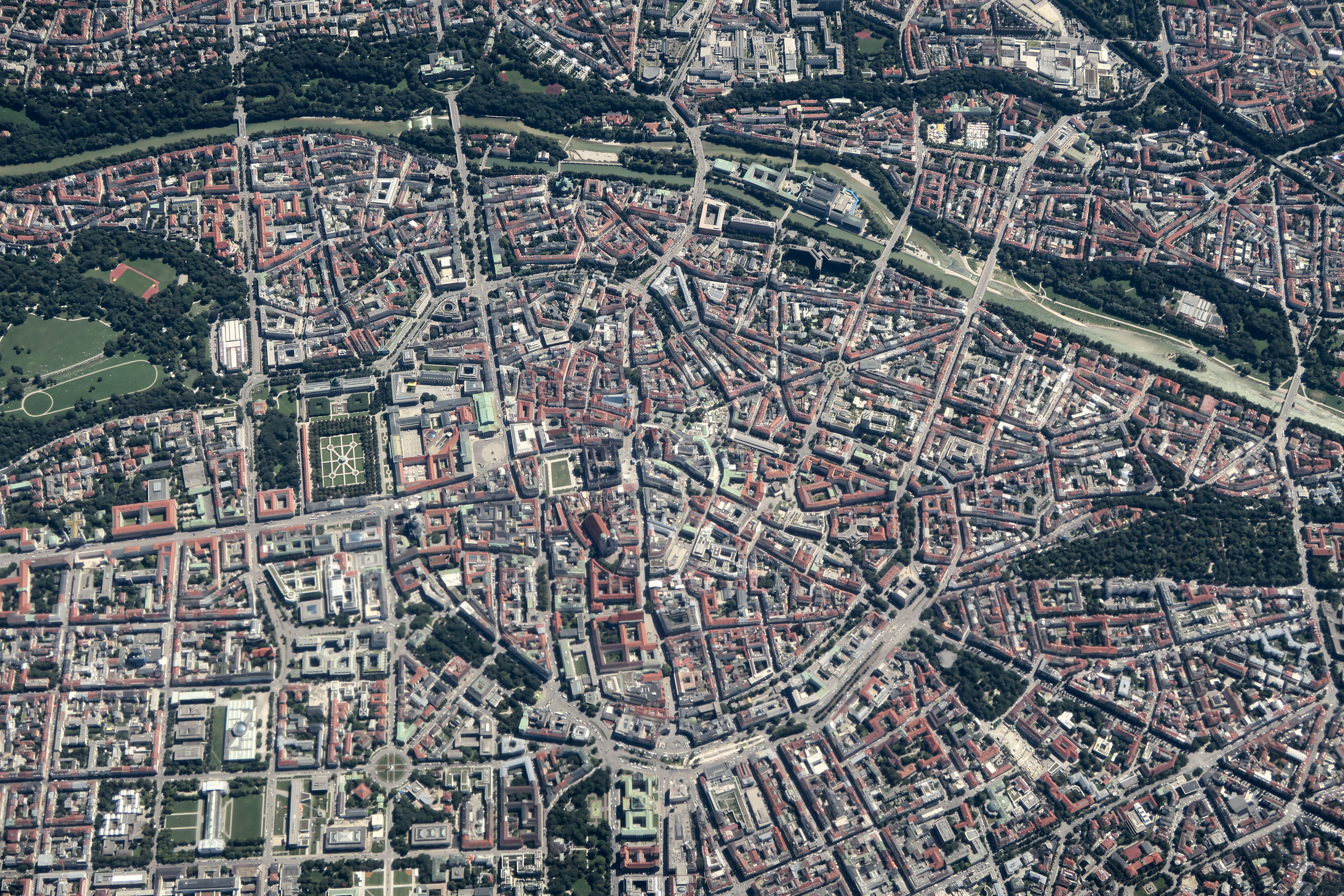
Aerial view of Munich city centre (facing southeast)

The northern part of this sandy plateau includes a highly fertile flint area no longer affected by Alpine tectonic processes, while the southern part is covered with morainic hills. Between them are fluvio-glacial outwash plains around Munich. Where these deposits become thinner, groundwater can rise through the gravel surface, causing marsh formation in northern Munich.

=== Climate ===
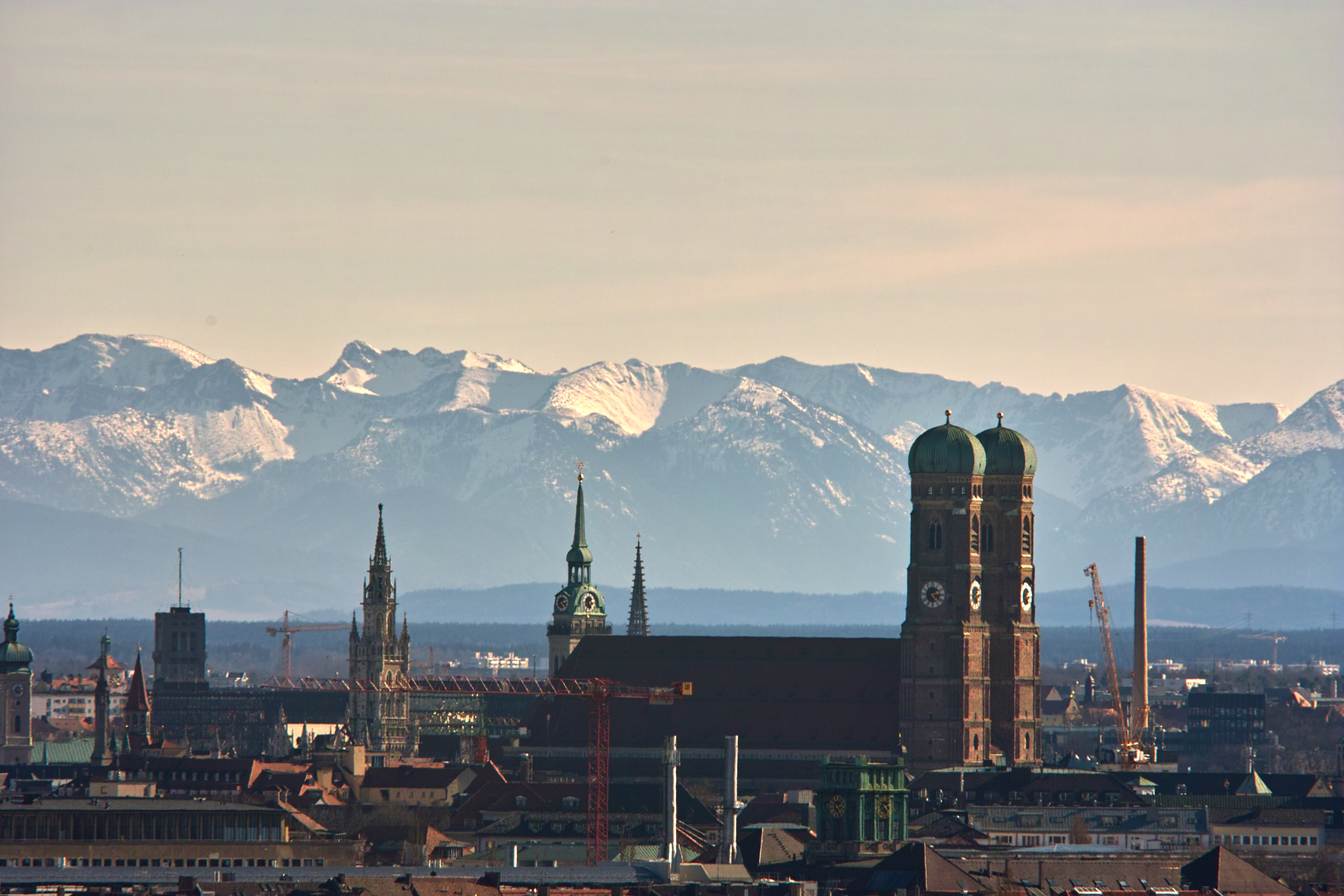
View of Munich with the Alps in the background

According to the Köppen climate classification, the climate is oceanic (Cfb) bordering on humid continental (Dfb), with features like warm to hot summers and cold winters, but without permanent snow cover. The city centre lies between both climates, while the airport of Munich has a humid continental climate. The warmest month, on average, is July. The coolest is January.

The proximity to the Alps brings higher volumes of rainfall and consequently greater susceptibility to flood problems. Studies of adaptation to climate change and extreme events are carried out; one of them is the Isar Plan of the EU Adaptation Climate.

Showers and thunderstorms bring the highest average monthly precipitation in late spring and throughout the summer. The most precipitation occurs in July, on average. Winter tends to have less precipitation, the least in February.

The higher elevation and proximity to the Alps cause the city to have more rain and snow than many other parts of Germany. The Alps affect the city's climate in other ways too; for example, the warm downhill wind from the Alps (föhn wind), which can raise temperatures sharply within a few hours even in the winter.

Being at the centre of Europe, Munich is subject to many climatic influences, so that weather conditions there are more variable than in other European cities, especially those further west and south of the Alps.

Munich is near the Alps. Annual variation in temperature can be significant, because there are no large bodies of water nearby. The winter in Munich is generally cold and overcast, and some Munich winters have significant snow. January is the coldest month. While winter averages remain only moderately cold, and relatively mild for an elevated inland location of Munich's latitude, inversion from the nearby Alps causes cold air to sink and result in temperatures below −15 °C (5 °F). In Munich the summer is usually pleasantly warm, with daytime temperatures averaging 25 °C (77 °F).

Munich is subject to active convective seasons and sometimes damaging events. The Alpine thunderstorm system moves along the mountain range, or detaches, heading east-north-east over the foothills of the Alps.

At Munich's official weather stations, the highest and lowest temperatures ever measured are 37.6 °C (100 °F), on 27 June 2026 in Munich City, and −31.6 °C (−24.9 °F), on 12 February 1929 in the Botanic Garden of the city.

Climate data for Munich (Dreimühlenviertel) (1991–2020 normals, extremes 1954–present)
Month	Jan	Feb	Mar	Apr	May	Jun	Jul	Aug	Sep	Oct	Nov	Dec	Year
Record high °C (°F)	18.9 (66.0)	21.4 (70.5)	24.0 (75.2)	32.2 (90.0)	31.8 (89.2)	37.6 (99.7)	37.5 (99.5)	37.0 (98.6)	31.8 (89.2)	28.2 (82.8)	24.2 (75.6)	21.7 (71.1)	37.6 (99.7)
Mean maximum °C (°F)	11.8 (53.2)	13.7 (56.7)	18.9 (66.0)	23.6 (74.5)	27.5 (81.5)	30.5 (86.9)	31.9 (89.4)	31.5 (88.7)	26.8 (80.2)	22.6 (72.7)	17.0 (62.6)	12.6 (54.7)	33.1 (91.6)
Mean daily maximum °C (°F)	4.0 (39.2)	5.6 (42.1)	10.1 (50.2)	15.2 (59.4)	19.4 (66.9)	22.9 (73.2)	24.9 (76.8)	24.7 (76.5)	19.6 (67.3)	14.5 (58.1)	8.2 (46.8)	4.8 (40.6)	14.5 (58.1)
Daily mean °C (°F)	0.9 (33.6)	1.9 (35.4)	5.7 (42.3)	10.2 (50.4)	14.3 (57.7)	17.8 (64.0)	19.6 (67.3)	19.4 (66.9)	14.7 (58.5)	10.1 (50.2)	4.9 (40.8)	1.8 (35.2)	10.1 (50.2)
Mean daily minimum °C (°F)	−1.8 (28.8)	−1.4 (29.5)	1.7 (35.1)	5.3 (41.5)	9.3 (48.7)	12.9 (55.2)	14.7 (58.5)	14.5 (58.1)	10.4 (50.7)	6.5 (43.7)	2.1 (35.8)	−0.8 (30.6)	6.1 (43.0)
Mean minimum °C (°F)	−13.8 (7.2)	−12.4 (9.7)	−7.3 (18.9)	−3.3 (26.1)	1.5 (34.7)	5.3 (41.5)	7.8 (46.0)	6.6 (43.9)	1.9 (35.4)	−2.1 (28.2)	−6.8 (19.8)	−12.3 (9.9)	−16.8 (1.8)
Record low °C (°F)	−22.2 (−8.0)	−25.4 (−13.7)	−16.0 (3.2)	−6.0 (21.2)	−2.3 (27.9)	1.0 (33.8)	6.5 (43.7)	4.8 (40.6)	0.6 (33.1)	−4.5 (23.9)	−11.0 (12.2)	−20.7 (−5.3)	−25.4 (−13.7)
Average precipitation mm (inches)	51.9 (2.04)	45.5 (1.79)	61.2 (2.41)	56.0 (2.20)	107.0 (4.21)	120.9 (4.76)	118.9 (4.68)	116.5 (4.59)	78.1 (3.07)	66.9 (2.63)	58.4 (2.30)	58.5 (2.30)	939.7 (37.00)
Average precipitation days (≥ 1.0 mm)	15.3	14.0	15.6	13.5	16.1	16.7	16.1	15.0	14.2	14.2	14.6	16.8	182.0
Average snowy days (≥ 1.0 cm)	11.7	11.2	4.5	0.6	0	0	0	0	0	0	3.3	8.0	39.3
Average relative humidity (%)	80.3	75.9	70.7	64.6	67.2	67.2	66.1	68.1	75.5	79.9	83.3	82.3	73.4
Mean monthly sunshine hours	74.6	95.2	145.3	186.0	213.0	223.7	241.4	232.1	169.7	123.3	74.0	66.4	1,841.4
Percentage possible sunshine	27	33	39	45	45	47	50	53	46	37	27	25	41
Average ultraviolet index	1	2	3	5	6	7	7	6	4	3	1	1	4
Source 1: World Meteorological Organization
Source 2: DWD SKlima.de Infoclimat and Weather Atlas (uv index)

==== Climate change ====
In Munich, the general trend of global warming with a rise of medium yearly temperatures of about 1 °C (1.8 °F) in Germany between 1900 and 2020 can be observed as well. In November 2016 the city council concluded officially that a further rise in medium temperature, a higher number of heat extremes, a rise in the number of hot days and nights with temperatures higher than 20 °C (tropical nights), a change in precipitation patterns, as well as a rise in the number of local instances of heavy rain, is to be expected as part of the ongoing climate change. The city administration decided to support a joint study from its own Referat für Gesundheit und Umwelt (department for health and environmental issues) and the German Meteorological Service that will gather data on local weather. The data is supposed to be used to create a plan for action for adapting the city to better deal with climate change as well as an integrated action program for climate protection in Munich. With the help of those programs issues regarding spatial planning and settlement density, the development of buildings and green spaces as well as plans for functioning ventilation in a cityscape can be monitored and managed.

== Demographics ==
According to the Bavarian State Office for Statistics, Munich had 1,505,036 inhabitants on 31 December 2025. On the same date, the city's municipal population register recorded 1,612,429 residents with a primary residence in Munich. The figures differ because the state statistics are based on population estimates updated from the 2022 census, whereas the municipal figures are derived from the residents' register.

Historical population
Year	Pop.	±%
1500	13,447	—
1600	21,943	+63.2%
1750	32,000	+45.8%
1880	230,023	+618.8%
1890	349,024	+51.7%
1900	499,932	+43.2%
1910	596,467	+19.3%
1920	666,000	+11.7%
1930	728,900	+9.4%
1940	834,500	+14.5%
1950	823,892	−1.3%
1960	1,055,457	+28.1%
1970	1,311,978	+24.3%
1980	1,298,941	−1.0%
1990	1,229,026	−5.4%
2001	1,227,958	−0.1%
2011	1,348,335	+9.8%
2022	1,478,638	+9.7%
Population size may be affected by changes in administrative divisions.

From only 24,000 inhabitants in 1700, the city population doubled about every 30 years. It was 100,000 in 1852, 250,000 in 1883 and 500,000 in 1901. Since then, Munich has become Germany's third-largest city. In 1933, 840,901 inhabitants were counted, and in 1957 over 1 million. According to the municipal population register, Munich passed 1.5 million residents in May 2015.

=== Immigration ===
In December 2023, Munich had 1.58 million inhabitants; 477,855 foreign nationals resided in the city as of 31 December 2023 with 42.88% of these residents being citizens of EU member states, and 29.66% citizens in European states not in the EU (including Kosovo and Turkey). Along with the Turks, the Croats are one of the two largest foreign minorities in the city, which is why some Croats refer to Munich as their "second capital". The largest groups of foreign nationals were Turks (38,947), Croats (37,541), Italians (28,142), Greeks (24,843), Bosnians (24,161), Ukrainians (21,899), and Austrians (21,944).

=== Religion ===
About 45% of Munich's residents are not affiliated with any religious group; this ratio represents the fastest growing segment of the population. As in the rest of Germany, the Catholic and Protestant churches have experienced a continuous decline in membership. As of 31 December 2017, 31.8% of the city's inhabitants were Catholic, 11.4% Protestant, 0.3% Jewish (see: History of the Jews in Munich), and 3.6% were members of an Orthodox Church (Eastern Orthodox or Oriental Orthodox). About 1% adhere to other Christian denominations. There is also a small Old Catholic parish and an English-speaking parish of the Episcopal Church in the city. According to Munich Statistical Office, in 2013 about 6.9% of Munich's population was Muslim. Munich has the largest Uyghur population with about 800 (whole Germany about 1,600) people with Uyghur diaspora. Many of them fled to Munich due to the Chinese government and are exiled in Munich. Munich is also home to World Uyghur Congress, which is an international organisation of exiled Uyghurs.

== Government and politics ==
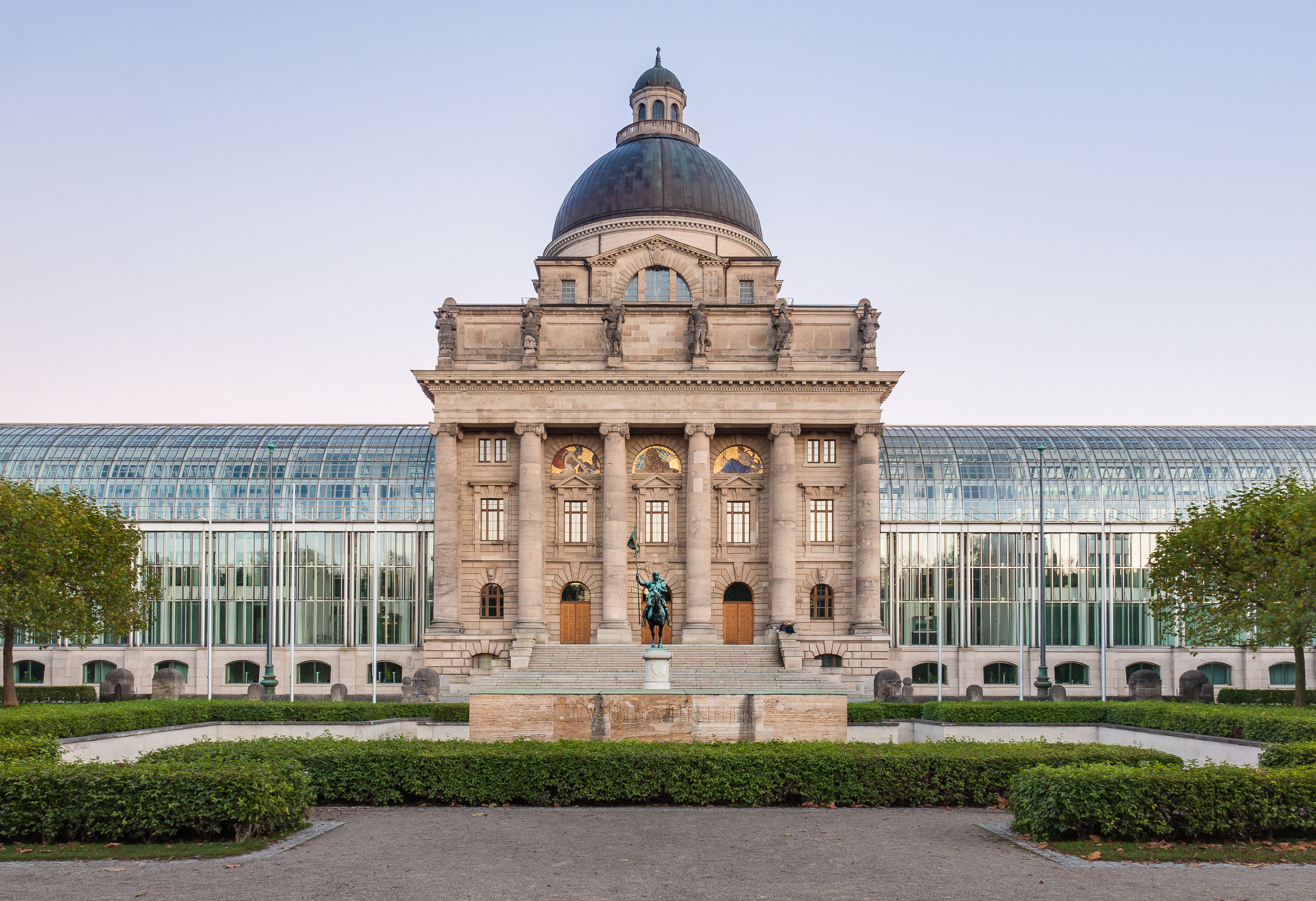
The Bavarian State Chancellery serves as the executive office of the Minister-President of Bavaria.

As the capital of Bavaria, Munich is an important political centre for both the state and country as a whole. It is the seat of the Landtag of Bavaria, the State Chancellery, and all state departments. Several national and international authorities are located in Munich, including the Federal Finance Court of Germany, the German Patent Office and the European Patent Office. Bavaria has been dominated by the Christian Social Union in Bavaria (CSU) on a federal, state, and local level since the establishment of the Federal Republic in 1949.

=== Mayor ===
The current mayor of Munich is Dominik Krause of the Greens.

The most recent mayoral election was held on 8 March 2026, with a runoff held on 22 March, and the results were as follows:

Candidate	Party	First round		Second round	
Candidate	Party	Votes	%	Votes	%
Dominik Krause	The Greens	168,166	29.5	272,533	56.4
Dieter Reiter	Social Democratic Party	203,205	35.6	211,075	43.6
Clemens Baumgärtner	Christian Social Union	121,760	21.3		
Markus Walbrunn	Alternative for Germany	25,054	4.4		
Stefan Jagel	The Left	13,781	2.4		
Michael Piazolo	Free Voters of Bavaria	10,632	1.9		
Tobias Ruff	Ecological Democratic Party	7,886	1.4		
Jörg Hoffmann	Free Democratic Party	6,990	1.2		
Felix Sproll	Volt	6,123	1.1		
Christiane Pfau	Bündnis Kultur	2,004	0.4		
Philipp Drabinski	Die PARTEI	1,981	0.3		
Dirk Höpner	Munich List	1,704	0.3		
Richard Progl	Bavaria Party	1,285	0.2		
Valid votes		570,571	99.6	483.608	99.5
Invalid votes		2,482	0.4	2,615	0.5
Total		573,053	100.0	486,223	100.0
Electorate/voter turnout		1,094,823	52.3	1,092,561	44.5
Source: Wahlen München (1st round, 2nd round)

=== City council ===
Groups in the council: PARTEI / 1; Linke / 5; SPD / 15; Greens/RL (Note: It is a local party, founded in 1989 to support the queer community. It is represented in some Munich borough councils since 1990 (with its stronghold in the borough of Ludwigsvorstadt-Isarvorstadt) and in the city council continuously since 1996.) / 22; Volt / 4; FDP/FW / 5; ÖDP/BK/ML / 4; CSU / 19; AfD / 5

The Munich city council (Stadtrat) governs the city alongside the Mayor. The most recent city council election was held on 8 March 2026, and the results were as follows:

Party	Lead candidate	Votes	%	+/−	Seats	+/−
Alliance 90/The Greens (Grüne)	Mona Fuchs	11,401,001	26.5	▼2.6	21	▼2
Christian Social Union (CSU)	Clemens Baumgärtner	10,704,696	24.9	▲0.2	19	▼1
Social Democratic Party (SPD)	Dieter Reiter	8,242,273	19.2	▼2.8	15	▼3
The Left (Die Linke)	Katharina Horn	2,823,717	6.6	▲3.3	5	▲2
Alternative for Germany (AfD)	Daniel Stanke	2,545,402	5.9	▲2.1	5	▲2
Volt Germany (Volt)	Felix Sproll	2,028,468	4.7	▲2.9	4	▲3
Free Democratic Party (FDP)	Jörg Hoffmann	1,455,250	3.4	▼0.1	3	±0
Ecological Democratic Party (ÖDP)	Tobias Ruff	1,143,769	2.7	▼1.3	2	▼1
Free Voters of Bavaria (FW)	Andreas Staufenbiel	1,094,411	2.5	±0	2	±0
Pink List (Rosa Liste)	Bernd Müller	422,499	1.0	±0	1	±0
Alliance Culture (BK)	Kathrin Schäfer	375,929	0.9	New	1	New
Die PARTEI (PARTEI)	Marie Burneleit	319,902	0.7	▼0.6	1	±0
Munich List (ML)	Dirk Höpner	318,342	0.7	▼0.1	1	New
Bavaria Party (BP)	Richard Progl	160,382	0.4	▼0.3	0	▼1
Valid votes		560,823	98.0			
Invalid votes		11,736	2.0			
Total		572,559	100.0		80	±0
Electorate/voter turnout		1,094,823	52.3	▲3.3		
Source: Wahlen München

The governing coalition after the 2020 election consisted of the Greens and the SPD, as well as the allied Volt and Pink List, which had one seat each. While the Greens had gained the most seats in the city council, the mayor was from the SPD. The parties made an agreement including social and ecological goals and focusing on heightening stipulations for new development in the city. The Red-Green alliance is a reprise of the 1990–2014 coalition, which was interrupted by a six-year CSU-SPD majority from 2014 to 2020.

=== State Landtag ===
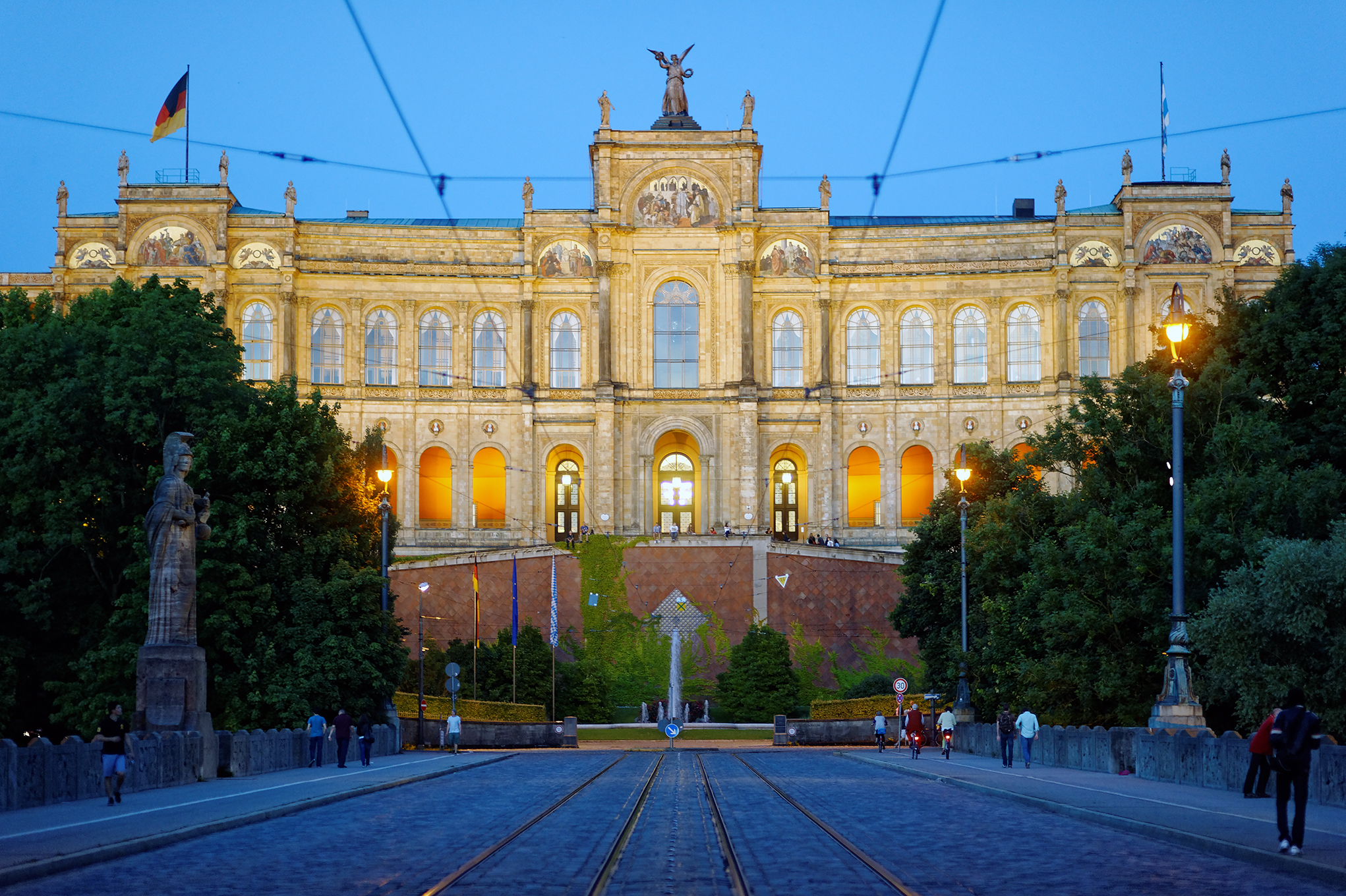
The Maximilianeum is the seat of the Bavarian State Parliament.

Munich is divided into nine constituencies for elections to the Landtag of Bavaria. The following candidates were directly elected in the 2023 Bavarian state election:

Constituency	Area	Party	Elected member
101 München-Hadern	Sendling-Westpark, Hadern; parts of Thalkirchen-Obersendling-Forstenried-Fürstenried-Solln and Laim	CSU	Georg Eisenreich
102 München-Bogenhausen	Bogenhausen, Berg am Laim; parts of Au-Haidhausen	CSU	Robert Brannekämper
103 München-Giesing	Sendling, Obergiesing-Fasangarten; parts of Untergiesing-Harlaching and Thalkirchen-Obersendling-Forstenried-Fürstenried-Solln	Greens	Gülseren Demirel
104 München-Milbertshofen	Milbertshofen-Am Hart, Schwabing-West; parts of Neuhausen-Nymphenburg	Greens	Katharina Schulze
105 München-Moosach	Moosach, Feldmoching-Hasenbergl; parts of Neuhausen-Nymphenburg	CSU	Alexander Dietrich
106 München-Pasing	Pasing-Obermenzing, Aubing-Lochhausen-Langwied, Allach-Untermenzing; parts of Laim	CSU	Josef Schmid
107 München-Ramersdorf	Ramersdorf-Perlach, Trudering-Riem	CSU	Markus Blume
108 München-Schwabing	Schwabing-Freimann, Maxvorstadt, Altstadt-Lehel	Greens	Christian Hierneis
109 München-Mitte	Ludwigsvorstadt-Isarvorstadt, Schwanthalerhöhe; parts of Au-Haidhausen and Untergiesing-Harlaching	Greens	Ludwig Hartmann

Alexander Dietrich left the Landtag on 30 September 2026 and was succeeded by Ludwig Spaenle on 1 October.

=== Federal parliament ===
For elections to the Bundestag, Munich is divided into four constituencies. At the 2025 German federal election, the following candidates received the most first votes in their respective constituencies:

Constituency	Boroughs	First-vote winner	Constituency seat
216 Munich North	Maxvorstadt, Schwabing-West, Moosach, Milbertshofen-Am Hart, Schwabing-Freimann, Feldmoching-Hasenbergl	Hans Theiss (CSU)	Yes
217 Munich East	Altstadt-Lehel, Au-Haidhausen, Bogenhausen, Berg am Laim, Trudering-Riem, Ramersdorf-Perlach	Wolfgang Stefinger (CSU)	Yes
218 Munich South	Sendling, Sendling-Westpark, Obergiesing-Fasangarten, Untergiesing-Harlaching, Thalkirchen-Obersendling-Forstenried-Fürstenried-Solln, Hadern	Claudia Küng (CSU)	No
219 Munich West/Centre	Ludwigsvorstadt-Isarvorstadt, Schwanthalerhöhe, Neuhausen-Nymphenburg, Pasing-Obermenzing, Aubing-Lochhausen-Langwied, Allach-Untermenzing, Laim	Stephan Pilsinger (CSU)	Yes

Under the electoral rules applied in 2025, a constituency candidate could enter the Bundestag only if their party received sufficient second votes to secure the seat. Claudia Küng won the most first votes in Munich South but did not enter parliament because this requirement was not met. Jamila Schäfer, who had won the constituency in 2021, was elected to the 21st Bundestag through the Greens' Bavarian party list.

=== Subdivisions ===
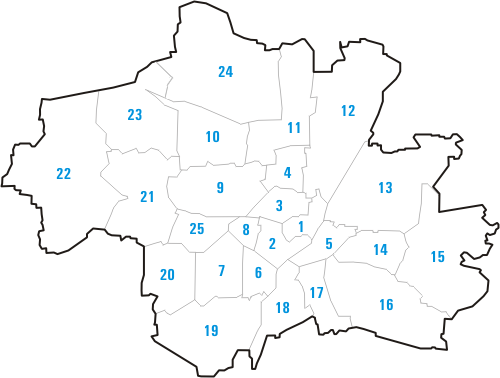
Munich's boroughs

Since the reform of 1992, Munich is divided into 25 administrative boroughs (Stadtbezirke). They are subdivided into 105 statistical areas.

Allach-Untermenzing (23), Altstadt-Lehel (1), Aubing-Lochhausen-Langwied (22), Au-Haidhausen (5), Berg am Laim (14), Bogenhausen (13), Feldmoching-Hasenbergl (24), Hadern (20), Laim (25), Ludwigsvorstadt-Isarvorstadt (2), Maxvorstadt (3), Milbertshofen-Am Hart (11), Moosach (10), Neuhausen-Nymphenburg (9), Obergiesing (17), Pasing-Obermenzing (21), Ramersdorf-Perlach (16), Schwabing-Freimann (12), Schwabing-West (4), Schwanthalerhöhe (8), Sendling (6), Sendling-Westpark (7), Thalkirchen-Obersendling-Forstenried-Fürstenried-Solln (19), Trudering-Riem (15), and Untergiesing-Harlaching (18).

There is no official division into districts. The number of districts is about 50, and if smaller units are counted as well, there are about 90 to 100 (see map). The three largest districts are Schwabing in the north (about 110,000 inhabitants), Sendling in the southwest (about 100,000 inhabitants), and Giesing in the south (about 80,000 inhabitants).

== Architecture ==
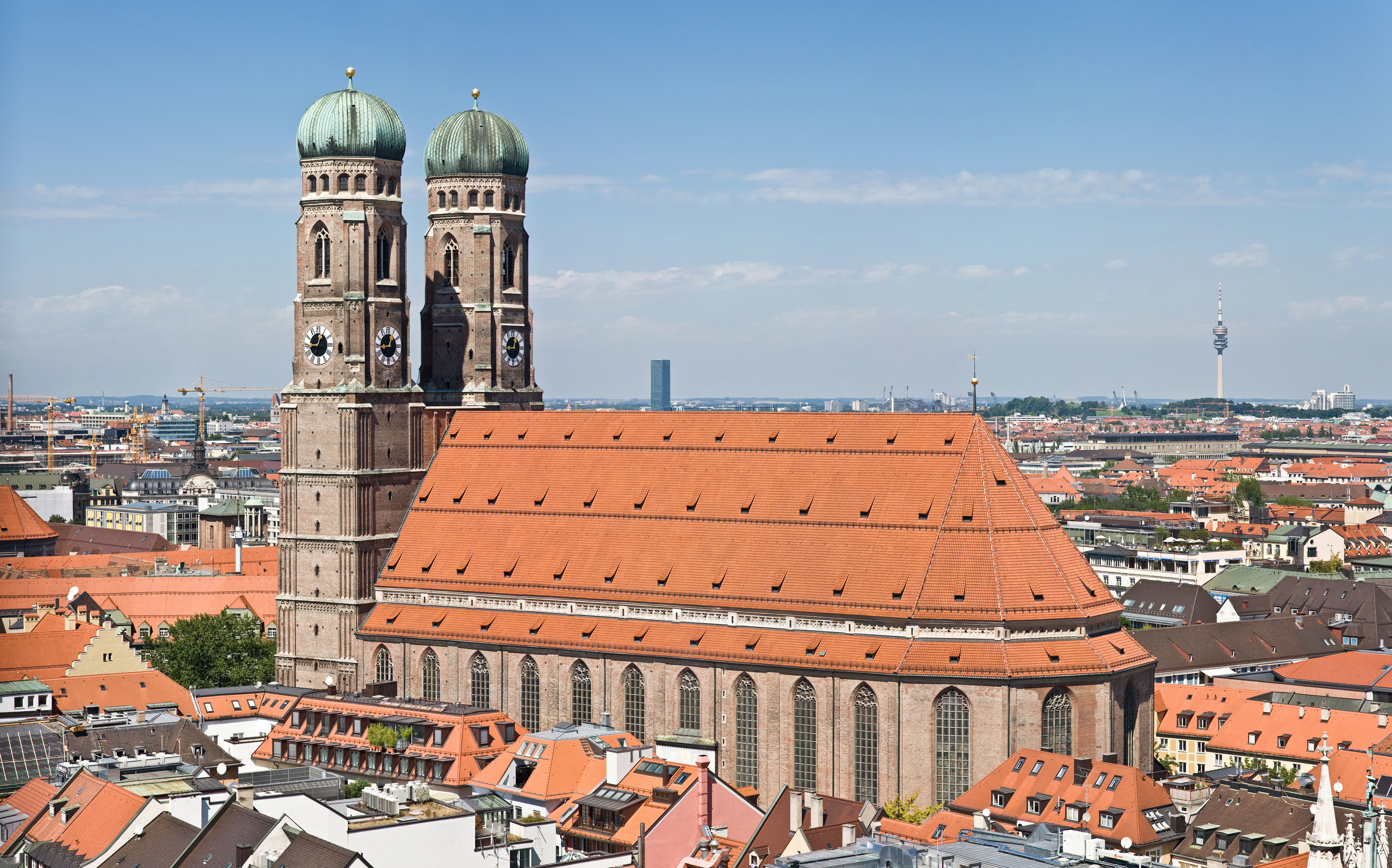
The Frauenkirche, consecrated in 1494, is a landmark and symbol of Munich.

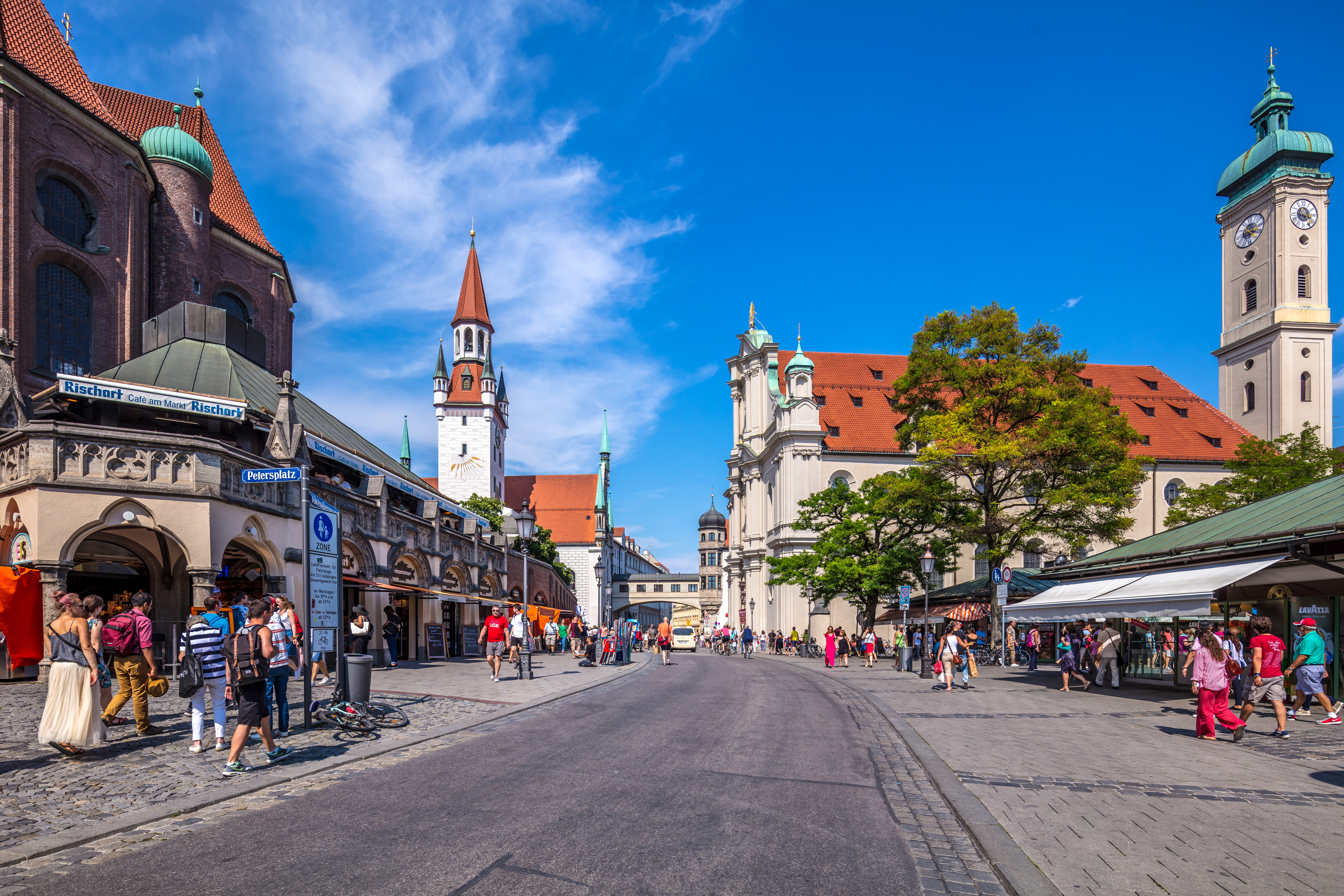
Old Town Hall and Heiliggeistkirche seen from Viktualienmarkt

=== Old Town ===
At the centre of the old town is the Marienplatz with the Old Town Hall and the New Town Hall. Its tower contains the Rathaus-Glockenspiel. The Peterskirche is the oldest church of the inner city. Nearby St. Peter, the Gothic hall-church Heiliggeistkirche was converted to baroque style from 1724 onwards and looks down upon the Viktualienmarkt. Three gates of the demolished medieval fortification survive; these are the Isartor, the Sendlinger Tor, and the Karlstor. The Karlstor leads up to the Stachus, a square dominated by the Justizpalast (Palace of Justice).

The Frauenkirche serves as the cathedral for the Catholic Archdiocese of Munich and Freising. The nearby Michaelskirche is the largest renaissance church north of the Alps, while the Theatinerkirche is a basilica in Italianate high baroque, which had a major influence on southern German baroque architecture. Its dome dominates the Odeonsplatz.

=== Palaces and castles ===
Schloss Nymphenburg (Nymphenburg Palace, construction started 1664) is a museum open to the public for tours.

The smaller Schloss Fürstenried (Fürstenried Palace, construction 1715–1717) is used by the Archdiocese of Munich and Freising as a conference location.

Schloss Blutenburg (Blutenburg Castle) opened as a children's library in 2024, but visitors may tour the late-Gothic Blutenburg Castle Church built on the same grounds.

The large Munich Residenz complex on the edge of Munich's Old Town now ranks among Europe's most significant museums of interior decoration. Within the Residenz is the splendid Cuvilliés Theatre and next door is the National Theatre Munich. Among the mansions that still exist in Munich are the Palais Porcia, the Palais Preysing, the Palais Holnstein and the Prinz-Carl-Palais. All mansions are situated close to the Residenz, so is the Alter Hof, the first residence of the House of Wittelsbach.

=== Modernist architecture ===
Despite Munich being the breeding ground for German Jugendstil, starting with the architect Martin Dülfer, Munich Jugendstil style was quickly submerged as historic trash. While the modernist architect Theodor Fischer was based in Munich, his influence on Munich underwhelmed. Prior to 1914 the city of Munich was under-industrialized. During the Weimar Republic, the Munich establishment was hostile to modernism. The TUM professor German Bestelmeyer favored a conservative style, and Jacobus Oud was rejected for the post of city building chief. Modernist exceptions include a series of post offices by Robert Vorhoelzer built in the late 1920s and early 1930s. Examples of avant-garde temporary constructions include the Wohnmaschine (Housing Machine) by Robert Vorhoelzer, as well as the Flachdachhaus (Flat Roof House) by Fritz Norkauer. Paul Schultze-Naumburg, and the Kampfbund enjoyed particular popularity.

=== High rise buildings ===
Several high-rise buildings are clustered at the northern edge of Munich in the skyline, like the HVB Tower, the Arabella High-Rise Building, the Highlight Towers, Uptown Munich, Münchner Tor and the BMW Headquarters next to the Olympic Park. Further high-rise buildings are located in the Werksviertel in Berg am Laim.

=== Long-term residential development ===
Munich is subject to a long-term residential development plan that is established by the city administration of Munich. The LaSie ("Langfristige Siedlungsentwicklung") was passed in 2011 in response to the acute housing crisis. LaSie is aligned with the strategic development plan passed for Munich in 1998 ("Perspektive München"). LaSie defines three priorities for the construction of residential housing in Munich. Existing housing estates, post-war low-density developments, and the suburban area are subject to densification ("Nachverdichtung"). Non-residential industrial areas are subject to conservation and will be turned into residential and mixed-use areas. On greenfield sites in the Munich periphery medium and large-scale housing estates are to be built so as to extend Munich's urban center.

== Parks ==
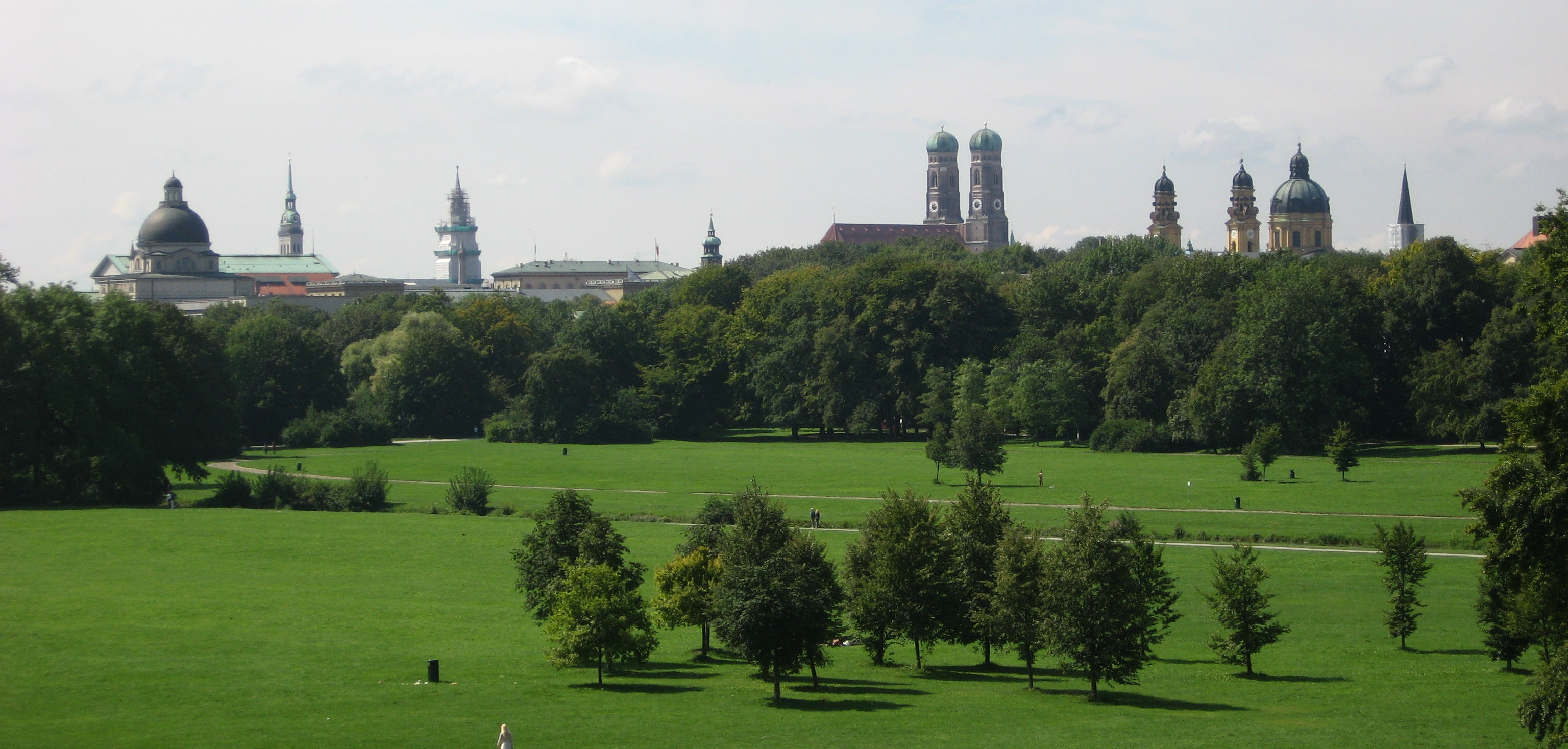
Englischer Garten with Munich skyline

Friedrich Ludwig von Sckell became famous for designing the Englischer Garten between 1789 and 1807. Besides planning the first public garden in Europe, Sckell also redesigned Baroque gardens as landscape gardens, including the parks of Nymphenburg Palace and the Botanischer Garten München-Nymphenburg.

Other large green spaces are the Olympiapark, the Westpark and the Ostpark. The city's oldest park is the Hofgarten, near the Residenz, dating back to the 16th century. The site of the largest beer garden in town, the former royal Hirschgarten, was founded in 1780.

== Culture ==
=== Language ===
German is spoken and understood in and around Munich. While the German language has many dialects, so-called "Standard German" or "High German" is learned in schools and spoken among Germans, Austrians and in some parts of Switzerland. A speaker of a Low German dialect in Hamburg may find it difficult to understand the dialect of a Bavarian mountaineer. The Bavarian dialects are recognized as regional languages and continue to be spoken alongside Standard German.

=== Museums ===
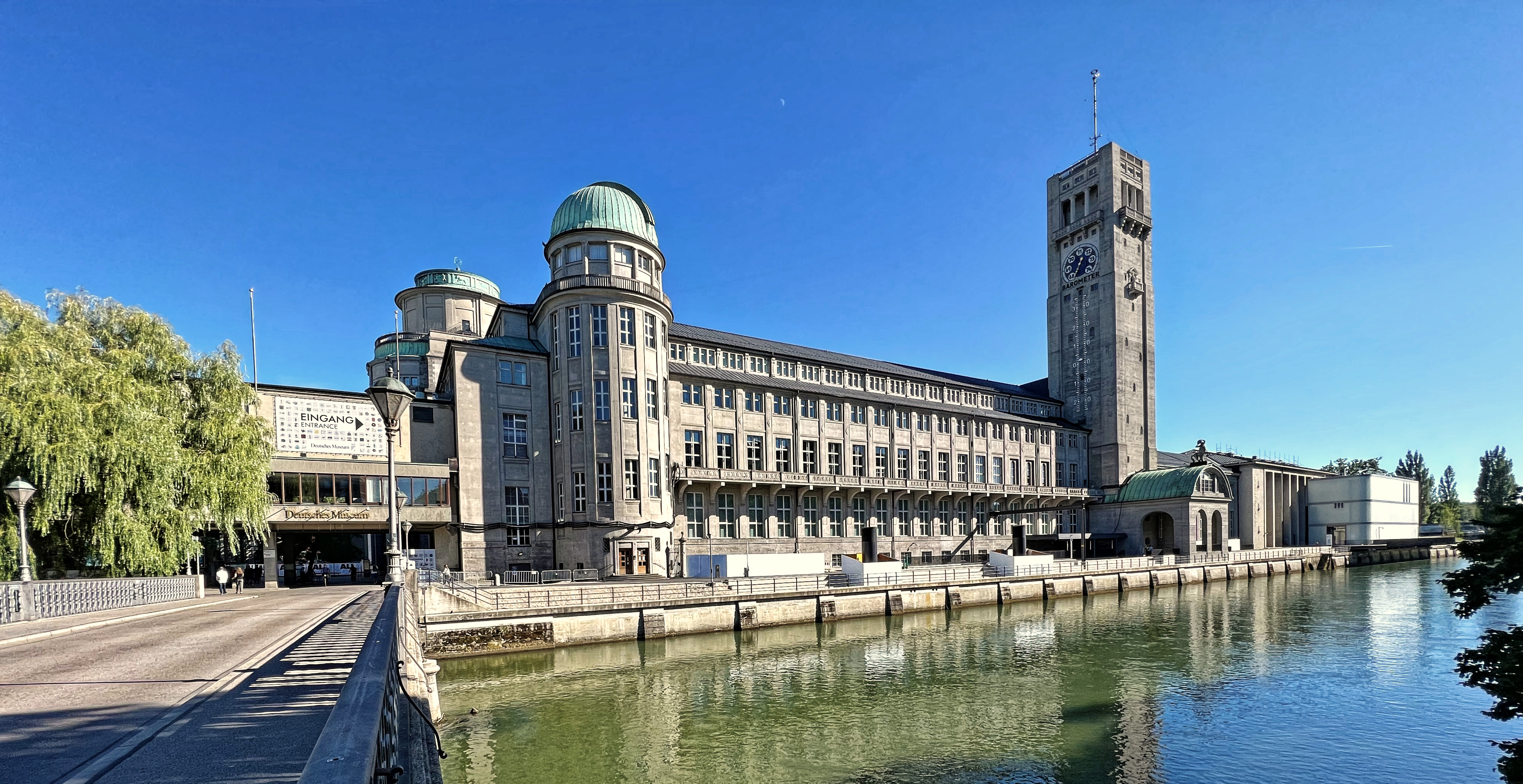
The Deutsches Museum is the world's largest museum of science and technology.

==== Technical Museums and Natural History Museums ====
In 1903 Oskar von Miller assembled a group of engineers and industrialists, who chartered the Deutsches Museum. The Museum was built with the financial support of the German business and imperial nobility community, as well as the blessing of Wilhelm II, German Emperor. The Deutsches Museum had its grand opening in 1925; it is the world's largest museum of science and technology. The Deutsches Museum now operates three locations, with exhibition space at Flugwerft Schleissheim and a transportation museum near Theresienwiese. The original site in central Munich continues to expand its exhibits. Further transportation and technical museums include the MVG Museum and the BMW Museum.

There are several natural history museums in Munich. Some are located in the area known as the "Apfelstrudel District". These include the Museum of Man and Nature, the Palaeontological Museum, the Museum Reich der Kristalle, the Bavarian State Archaeological Collection, the Bavarian State Collection of Zoology, the Geologisches Museum München, the Botanische Staatsammlung München, and the German Hunting and Fishing Museum.

==== Art Museums and Galleries ====
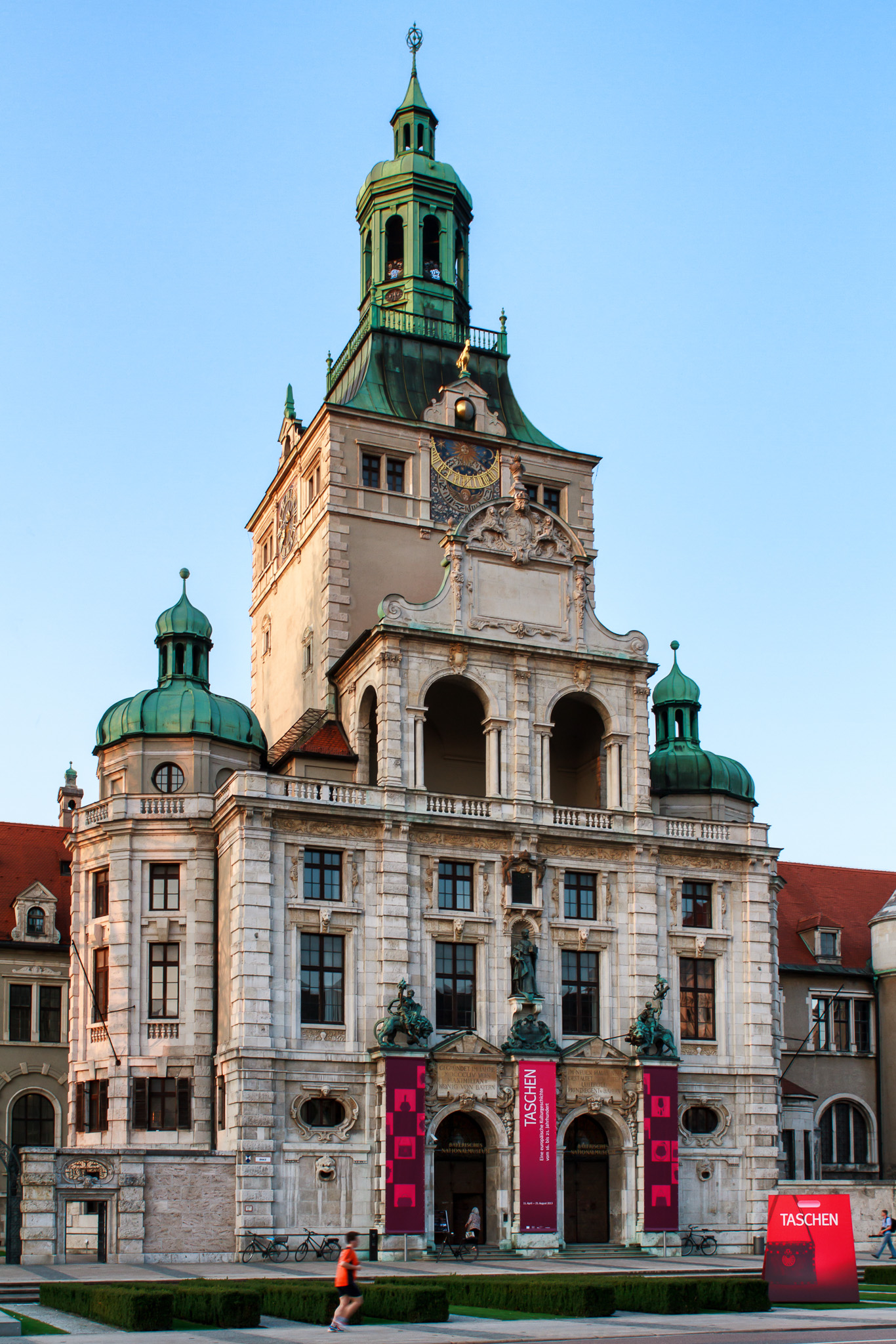
Bavarian National Museum

City guides published in the early 1860s directed tourists to Munich's architecture and art collections, which at the time were unique in Germany and are a legacy mainly of Ludwig I of Bavaria, with contributions from Maximilian II of Bavaria. After the first German art exhibition in the Glaspalast for an international audience in 1869, Munich emerged as a focal point for the arts. Men of distinction from around the world visited the Academy of Fine Arts under the directorship of Karl von Piloty and later Wilhelm von Kaulbach.

The city has several important art museums and galleries, many of which can be found in the Kunstareal. This neighborhood includes several of the galleries of the Bavarian State Painting Collections, most notably the three "Pinakotheken" (Alte Pinakothek, Neue Pinakothek, and Pinakothek der Moderne). The Alte Pinakothek contains works of European masters between the 14th and 18th centuries. Major displays include Albrecht Dürer's Self-Portrait (1500), his Four Apostles, Raphael's paintings The Canigiani Holy Family and Madonna Tempi as well as Peter Paul Rubens large Judgment Day. The Neue Pinakothek, like other German museums, was wholly reconstructed from 1974 until 1981. The Pinakothek der Moderne exhibits modern art, architecture, design, and works on paper. The principal focus of its permanent collection is Classical Modernism, but the displays are enhanced continuously with gifts from private collections. Also included in the Bavarian State Painting Collections are the Museum Brandhorst, a modern and contemporary art museum in the Kunstareal, and the Schackgalerie, an important gallery of German 19th-century paintings.

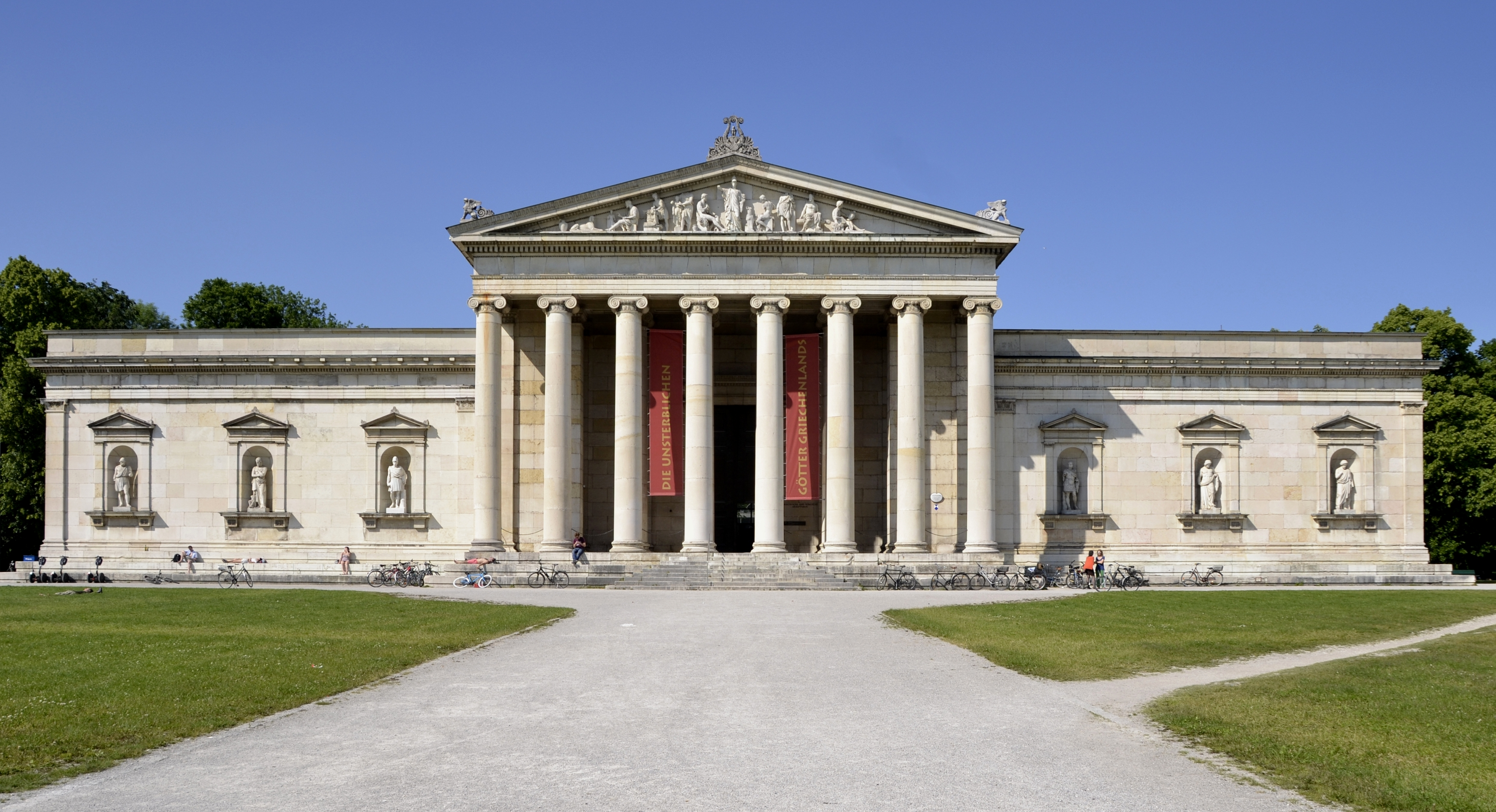
The Glyptothek houses King Ludwig I's collection of Greek and Roman sculptures.

Several further museums are located in the Kunstareal neighborhood. The Lenbachhaus displays works of the movement Der Blaue Reiter (The Blue Rider), a Munich-based modernist art. Another museum is the Staatliche Sammlung für Ägyptische Kunst (the State Collection of Egyptian Art). An extensive collection of Greek and Roman art is held in the Glyptothek and the Staatliche Antikensammlungen (the State Antiquities Collections). Works on display include the Medusa Rondanini, the Barberini Faun and figures from the Temple of Aphaea on Aegina for the Glyptothek. The Staatliche Graphische Sammlung, the Zentralinstitut für Kunstgeschichte, and the Museum für Abgüsse Klassischer Bildwerke are also housed in the building of the former Munich Central Collecting Point at Königsplatz.

Elsewhere in the city are many other notable public art collections, such as the Haus der Kunst, the Bavarian National Museum, and the Villa Stuck. There are also several private collections and art exhibition spaces, such as the Goetz Collection, the Museum of Urban and Contemporary Art, the Kunsthalle der Hypo-Kulturstiftung, and Lothringer13.

==== Cultural Museums and Memorial Sites ====
The Munich City Museum is located the old gothic arsenal building in the inner city and contains a variety of cultural collections and museums, such as the Munich Film Archive. The main museum building is closed for renovations and is scheduled to reopen in summer 2031. Across the Sankt-Jakobs-Platz from the city museum is the Jewish Museum Munich, located next to the Ohel Jakob Synagogue.

The Museum Five Continents is the second largest collection in Germany of artefacts and objects from outside Europe, while the Bavarian National Museum and the adjoining Bavarian State Archaeological Collection display regional art and cultural history. Throughout the city are several smaller museums focused on various historical and cultural aspects, such as the Sudeten German Museum, the Beer and Oktoberfest Museum, the Deutsches Brauereimuseum, the Deutsches Theatermuseum, the Valentin-Karlstadt-Musäum, and the Alpine Museum.

Several former residences of the Wittelsbach monarchs of Bavaria located in the city can be visited. The Residenz, the former royal palace, houses a museum, treasury, the Cuvilliés Theatre, and the Bavarian state coin collection. The royal family's former summer residence, the Nymphenburg Palace, also includes space for the Marstallmuseum and the Nymphenburg Porcelain Manufactory. Just outside the city limits is an additional summer place complex, Schleissheim Palace.

Several museums and memorials attest to the city's complicated history under National Socialism. In May 2015, the Munich Documentation Centre for the History of National Socialism opened to the public, and the memorial museum of the former Dachau concentration camp is just outside the city. The Erinnerungsort Olympia-Attentat further commemorates the victims of the Munich massacre during the 1972 Summer Olympics.

=== Music ===
Munich is a major international musical centre and has played host to many prominent composers including Orlande de Lassus, Orlando di Lasso, Wolfgang Amadeus Mozart, Carl Maria von Weber, Richard Wagner, Gustav Mahler, Richard Strauss, Max Reger and Carl Orff. Some notable classical music compositions created in and around Munich include Richard Strauss's tone poem Also sprach Zarathustra or Carl Orff's Carmina Burana.

==== Opera and Orchestral Music ====
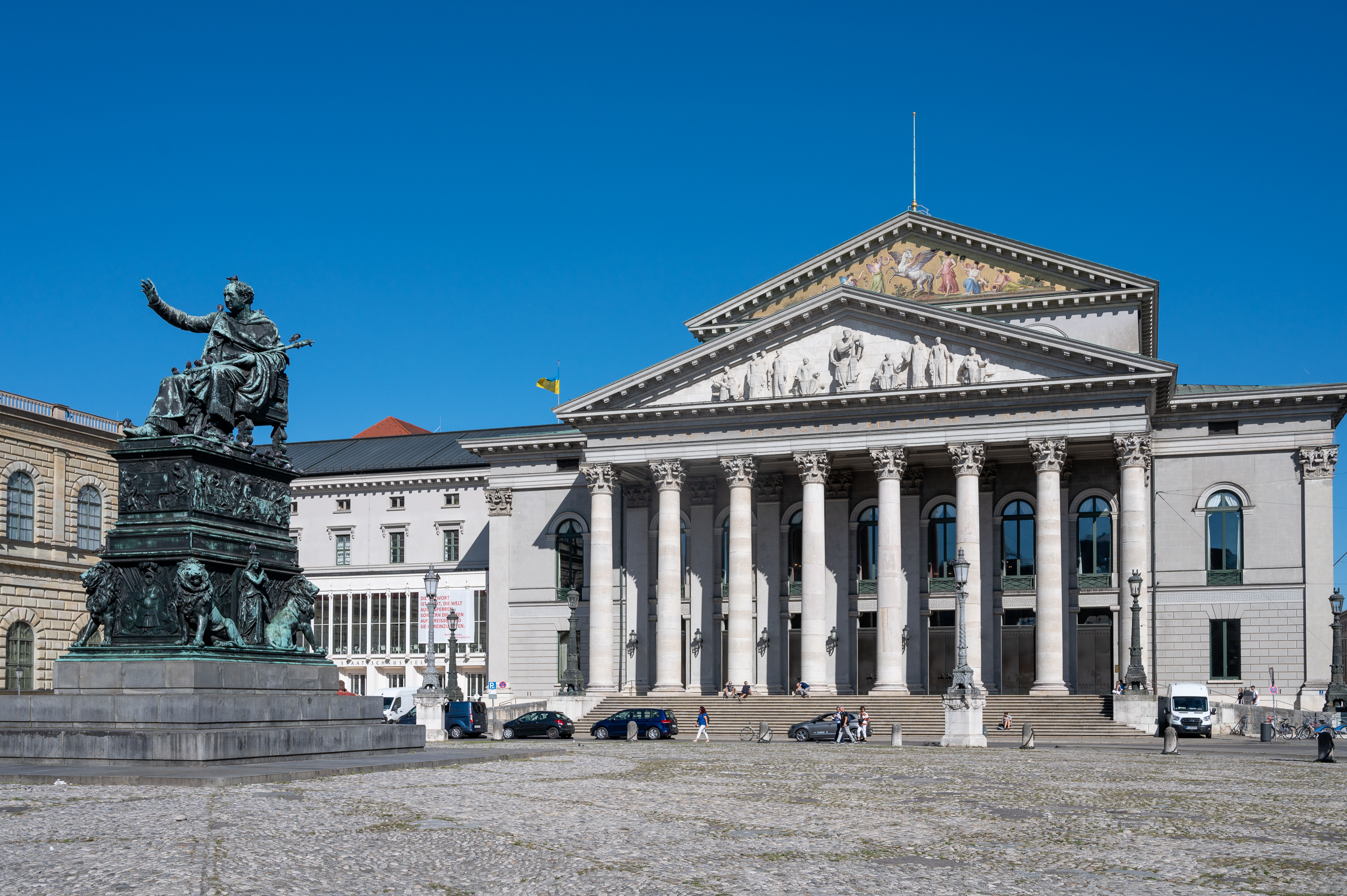
The National Theatre is home to the Bavarian State Opera and the Bavarian State Orchestra.

While Richard Wagner was also a supporter of William I, German Emperor, he was generously sponsored by Ludwig II of Bavaria, who sponsored the successful Munich premiere of Wagner's Die Meistersinger von Nürnberg (The Mastersingers of Nuremberg) at the Hoftheater, now the National Theatre Munich.

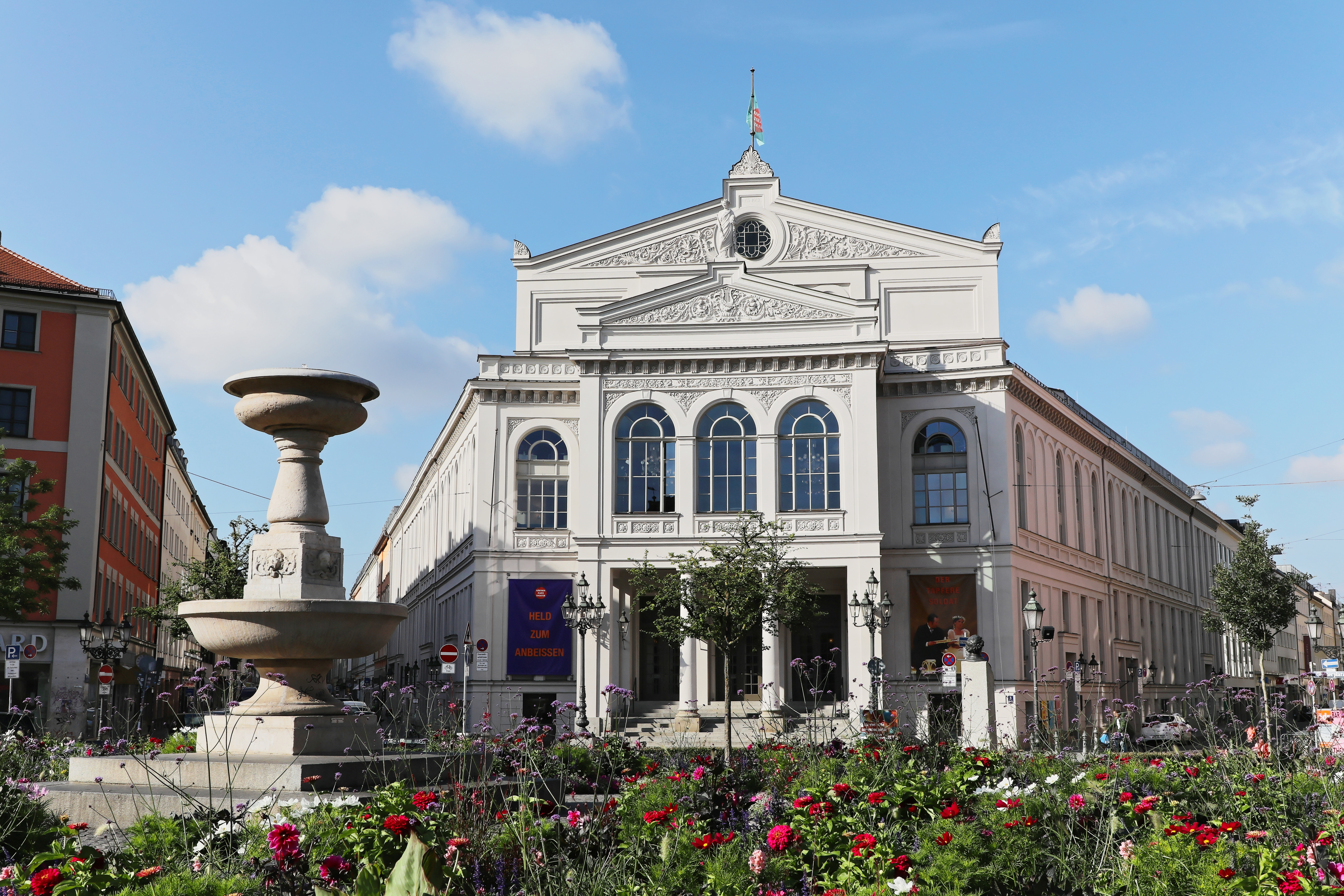
Staatstheater am Gärtnerplatz

The National Theatre Munich is now home to the Bavarian State Opera and the Bavarian State Orchestra. Next door, the modern Residenz Theatre was erected in the former royal palace that also houses the Cuvilliés Theatre. The Staatstheater am Gärtnerplatz is a state theater while another opera house, the Prinzregententheater, has become the home of the Bavarian Theater Academy and the Munich Chamber Orchestra.

The modern Gasteig centre houses the Munich Philharmonic Orchestra. The third orchestra in Munich with international importance is the Bavarian Radio Symphony Orchestra. Its primary concert venue is the Herkulessaal in the former city royal residence, the Munich Residenz. Many important conductors have been attracted by the city's orchestras, including Felix Weingartner, Hans Pfitzner, Hans Rosbaud, Hans Knappertsbusch, Sergiu Celibidache, James Levine, Christian Thielemann, Lorin Maazel, Rafael Kubelík, Eugen Jochum, Sir Colin Davis, Mariss Jansons, Bruno Walter, Georg Solti, Zubin Mehta and Kent Nagano. A stage for shows, big events and musicals is the Deutsche Theater. It is Germany's largest theatre for guest performances.

==== Pop and electronica ====
In the late-1960s Munich was the centre of Krautrock in southern Germany, with bands such as Amon Düül II, Embryo or Popol Vuh hailing from the city.

In the 1970s, the Musicland Studios in Munich became a world-renowned recording studio, with bands such as the Rolling Stones, Led Zeppelin, Deep Purple and Queen recording albums there. Musicland Studios also played a role in the development of electronic music through the work of genre pioneer Giorgio Moroder, who invented synth disco and electronic dance music, and the recordings of disco musician Donna Summer.

Several bands associated with the Neue Deutsche Welle of the late 1970s and 1980s were founded in Munich, including Spider Murphy Gang, Münchener Freiheit, and FSK.

In the late 1990s, DJ Hell brought together international pioneers of the developing musical genre of Electroclash through his International DeeJay Gigolo Records label in Munich.

Other notable musicians from Munich include the singer-songwriter Konstantin Wecker, singer Lou Bega, known for his cover of the song "Mambo No. 5", as well as the contemporary rock bands Colour Haze and Sportfreunde Stiller.

The biggest club in the city by capacity, Neuraum, also regularly books electronic dance music acts.

=== Theatre ===
The Munich Kammerspiele is one of the most important German-language theatres. Several notable playwrights have lived and worked in Munich, including Christian Friedrich Hebbel, Henrik Ibsen, Bertolt Brecht, and Frank Wedekind.

Munich was also the site of a vibrant cabaret performance scene during the Weimar era, epitomized by the short films and performances of Karl Valentin and Liesl Karlstadt. Their work is commemorated at the Valentin-Karlstadt-Musäum in Isartor.

The Circus Krone, based in Munich, is one of the largest circuses in Europe. It was the first and still is one of only a few in Western Europe to also occupy a building of its own.

=== Art and Literature ===
Painters and sculptors based in Munich in the 15th and 16th century included Erasmus Grasser and Jan Polack.

==== Baroque and Rococo ====
During the Baroque and Rococo eras, several sculptors, architects, and painters were based in Munich, including Hans Krumpper, Johann Baptist Zimmermann, Cosmas Damian Asam, Johann Michael Fischer, Egid Quirin Asam, François de Cuvilliés, Johann Baptist Straub and Ignaz Günther.

==== Biedermeier ====
The Biedermeier era of the early 19th century was named after a character that regularly appeared in the satire magazine Fliegende Blätter, which was published by Adolf Kussmaul and Ludwig Eichrodt in Munich between 1855 and 1857. The Biedermeier era painters Ferdinand Georg Waldmüller, Moritz von Schwind, and Carl Spitzweg are shown in the Neue Pinakothek.

Further artists of the Biedermeier era based in Munich include sculptor Ludwig von Schwanthaler and the painters Carl Rottmann, Wilhelm von Kaulbach, Karl Piloty.

==== Prinzregentenzeit ====
Celebrity literary figures worked in Munich especially during the final decades of the Kingdom of Bavaria, the so-called Prinzregentenzeit from 1886 to 1912, under the reign of Luitpold, Prince Regent of Bavaria. This includes the authors Thomas Mann, Heinrich Mann, Paul Johann Ludwig von Heyse, Rainer Maria Rilke, Ludwig Thoma, Fanny zu Reventlow, Gustav Meyrink, and Erich Mühsam as well as the playwrights Oskar Panizza, Frank Wedekind, and Max Halbe. Thomas Mann wrote in his novella Gladius Dei about this period: "München leuchtete" (literally "Munich shone").

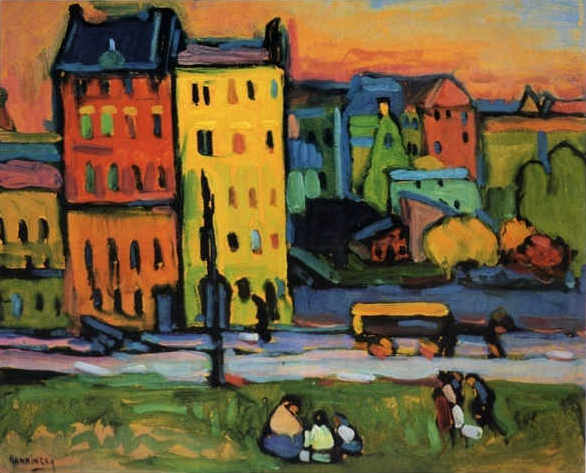
Wassily Kandinsky's Houses in Munich (1908)

At the turn of the 20th century the neighbourhood of Schwabing became known as a bohemian cultural epicenter for both literature and the fine arts. Central to Schwabing's bohemian scene were Künstlerlokale (Artist's Cafés) such as Café Stefanie or Simpl, whose liberal ways differed fundamentally from Munich's more traditional localities. The Simpl, which survives to this day, was named after Munich's anti-authoritarian satirical magazine Simplicissimus, founded in 1896 by Albert Langen and Thomas Theodor Heine. Vladimir Lenin authored the pamphlet What Is to Be Done? while living in Schwabing.

Artists of the late-19th and early-20th century based in Munich include Franz von Lenbach, Wilhelm Leibl, Lovis Corinth, and Franz Stuck.

==== Weimar Republic ====
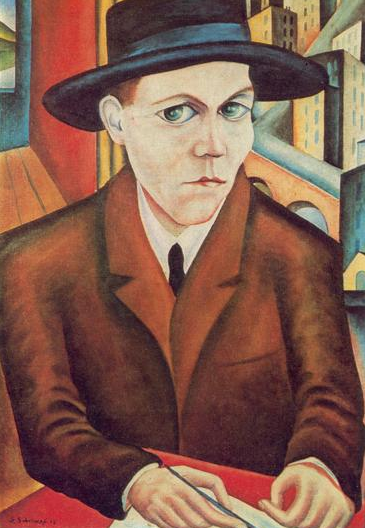
Portrait of Oskar Maria Graf by Georg Schrimpf (1927)

Munich remained a centre of cultural life during the Weimar Republic, with writers such as Lion Feuchtwanger, Bertolt Brecht, Ricarda Huch, Oskar Maria Graf, Annette Kolb, Ernst Toller, Hugo Ball, and Klaus Mann living in the city.

==== Post-war literature ====
After World War II, Munich soon again became a focal point of the German literary scene and remains so to this day. Writers such as Wolfgang Koeppen, Erich Kästner, Eugen Roth, Alfred Andersch, Elfriede Jelinek, Hans Magnus Enzensberger, Michael Ende, Franz Xaver Kroetz, Gerhard Polt and Patrick Süskind have called the city their home.

=== Cinema ===
Munich has been home to many of the directors active in the New German Cinema movement, including Rainer Werner Fassbinder, Werner Herzog, Edgar Reitz and Herbert Achternbusch. New German Cinema was a significant shift in post-war German filmmaking that rebuffed traditional funding structures and kitschy subject matter in favour of cinematic experimentation and political expression. In 1971, the Filmverlag der Autoren was founded in Munich as an independent co-operative that produced and distributed the work of several of these directors. Munich also served as the setting for many of Fassbinder's films, including Ali: Fear Eats the Soul (1974). Fassbinder and his "clan" of actors were also regulars at local sites, such as the Hotel Deutsche Eiche near Gärtnerplatz.

In 1919, the film producer and distributor Bavaria Film was founded in Grünwald as Münchner Lichtspielkunst (Emelka), which developed into one of Europe's largest film studios. Among the internationally well-known films produced at the associated Bavaria Studios are The Pleasure Garden (1925) by Alfred Hitchcock, The Great Escape (1963) by John Sturges, Paths of Glory (1957) by Stanley Kubrick, Willy Wonka & the Chocolate Factory (1971) by Mel Stuart and both Das Boot (1981) and The Neverending Story (1984) by Wolfgang Petersen.

Other significant companies based in the city include the motion picture film equipment manufacturer Arri and the film production company Constantin Film. The University of Television and Film Munich (HFF) is also a publicly funded film school based in the city and the alma mater of Maren Ade, Wim Wenders, Caroline Link, and Hito Steyerl.

Munich remains one of the centres of the German film and entertainment industry. In addition to those above, directors such as Billy Wilder, Orson Welles, John Huston, Ingmar Bergman, Claude Chabrol, and Fritz Umgelter and have made films in Munich.

=== Cuisine and culinary specialities ===
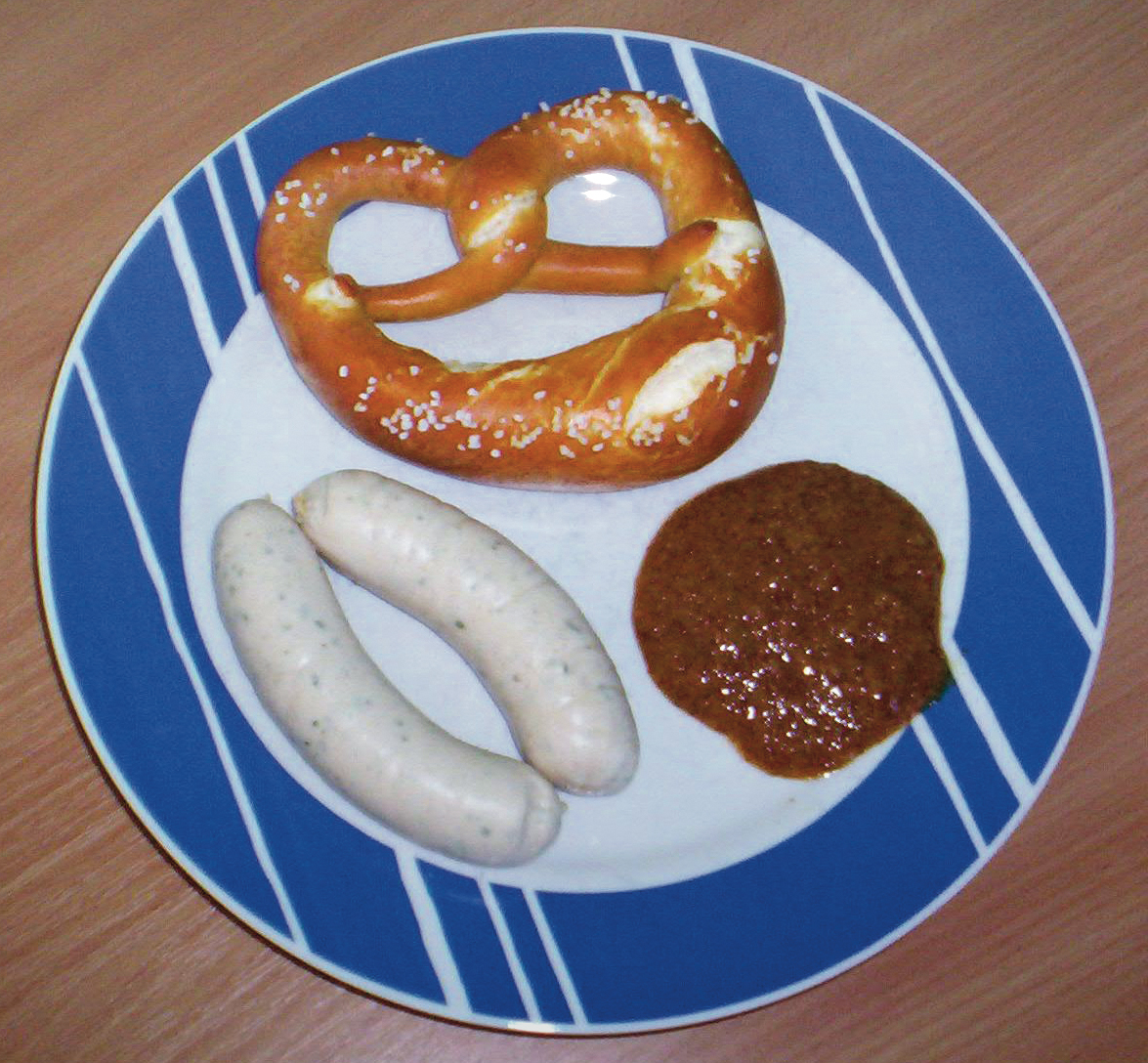
Weißwurst with sweet mustard and a pretzel

Munich cuisine is a part of the broader Bavarian cuisine. Munich Weißwurst ("white sausage", German: Münchner Weißwurst) was invented in the city in 1857 and is a Munich speciality. Traditionally Weißwurst is served in pubs before noon and is served with sweet mustard and freshly baked pretzels.

Munich has 11 restaurants that have been awarded one or more Michelin Guide stars in 2021.

In 1971 Eckart Witzigmann teamed up with a Munich building contractor to finance and open the Tantris restaurant in Schwabing. Witzigmann is credited for starting the German Küchenwunder (kitchen wonder).

==== Beers and breweries ====
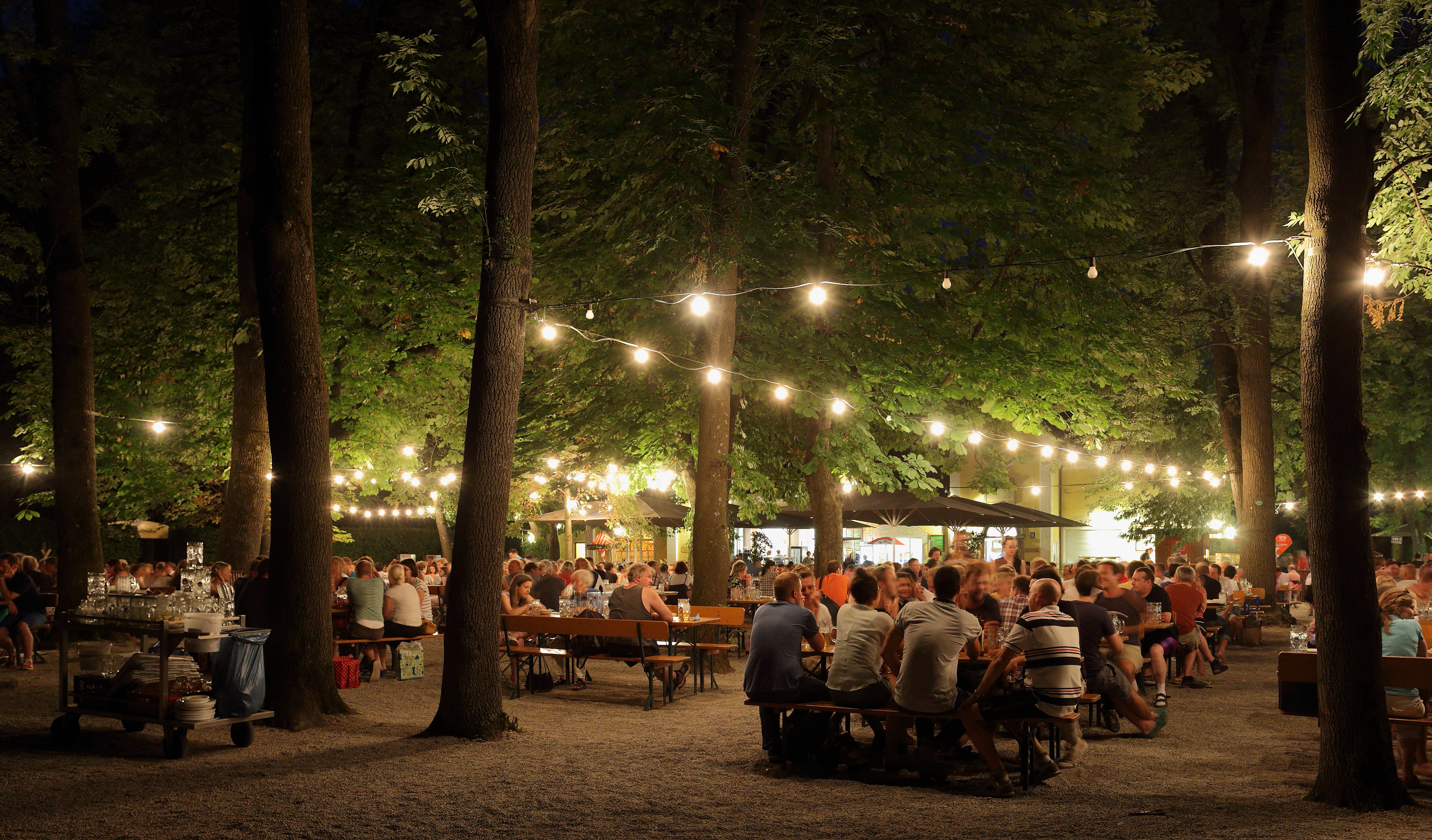
Beer garden in Munich

Munich is known for its breweries and Weissbier (wheat beer). Helles, a pale lager with a translucent gold color, is the most popular contemporary Munich beer. Helles has largely replaced Munich's dark beer, known as Dunkel, which gets its color from roasted malt. It was the typical beer in Munich in the 19th century. Starkbier is the strongest Munich beer, with a high alcohol content of 6%–9%. It is dark amber in color and has a heavy malty taste. The beer served at Oktoberfest is a special type of beer with a higher alcohol content.

Wirtshäuser are traditional Bavarian pubs, many of which also have small outside areas. Biergärten (beer gardens) are a popular fixture in Munich's gastronomic landscape. They are central to the city's culture, and are an overt melting pot for members of all walks of life, regardless of social class. There are many smaller beer gardens, but some beer gardens have thousands of seats. Large beer gardens can be found in the Englischer Garten, on the Nockherberg, and in the Hirschgarten.

The six main breweries in Munich are Augustiner-Bräu, Hacker-Pschorr Brewery, Hofbräuhaus, Löwenbräu, Paulaner, and Spaten-Franziskaner-Bräu. Smaller breweries are becoming more prevalent in Munich.

=== Festivals ===
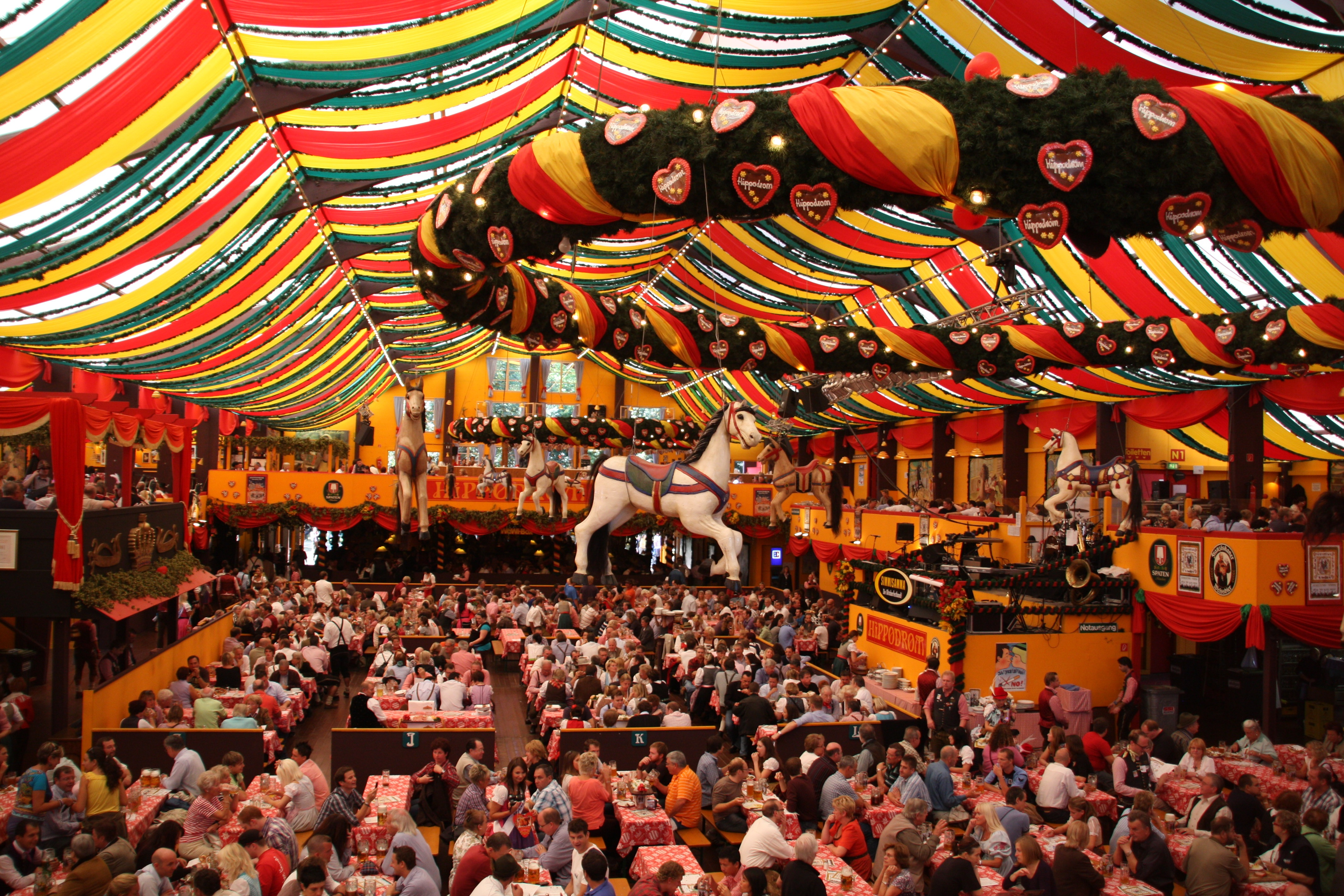
The Oktoberfest is the world's largest beer festival, attracting around seven million visitors every year.

==== Coopers' Dance ====
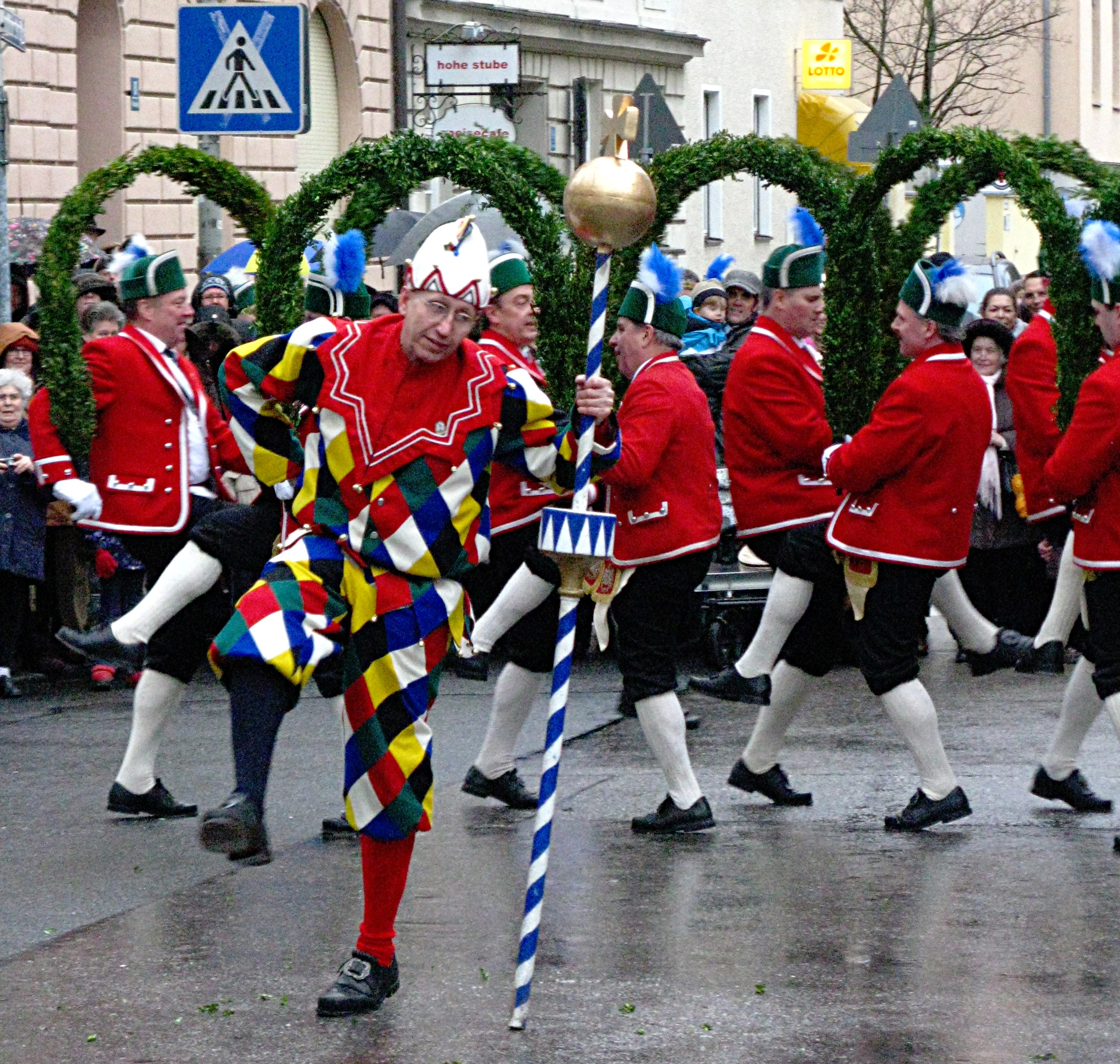
Schäfflertanz in Neuhausen, 2012

The Coopers' Dance (German: Schäfflertanz) is a guild dance of coopers originally started in Munich. Beginning in the early 1800s the custom spread via the travels of journeymen, and it is now a common tradition throughout the Old Bavaria region. The dance was supposed to be held every seven years.

==== Strong Beer Festival ====
Munich is home to the famous Nockherberg Strong Beer Festival (German: Starkbierfest) during the Lenten fasting period (usually in March). Its origins go back to the 17th/18th century, but has become popular when the festivities were first televised in the 1980s. The festival includes comical speeches and a mini-musical in which numerous German politicians are parodied by look-alike actors.

==== Frühlingsfest ====
Held for two weeks at the Theresienwiese from the end of April to the beginning of May, celebrating and serving the new local spring beers.

==== Auer Dult ====
A regular event combining a market and a German style folk festival on the Mariahilfplatz. The Auer Dult can be up to 300 stalls, selling handmade crafts, household goods, and local foods.

==== Kocherlball ====
Munich's Kocherlball (Cooks' Ball) is an annual event to commemorate all servants, ranging from kitchenhands to cooks. The tradition started in the 19th century.

==== Tollwood ====
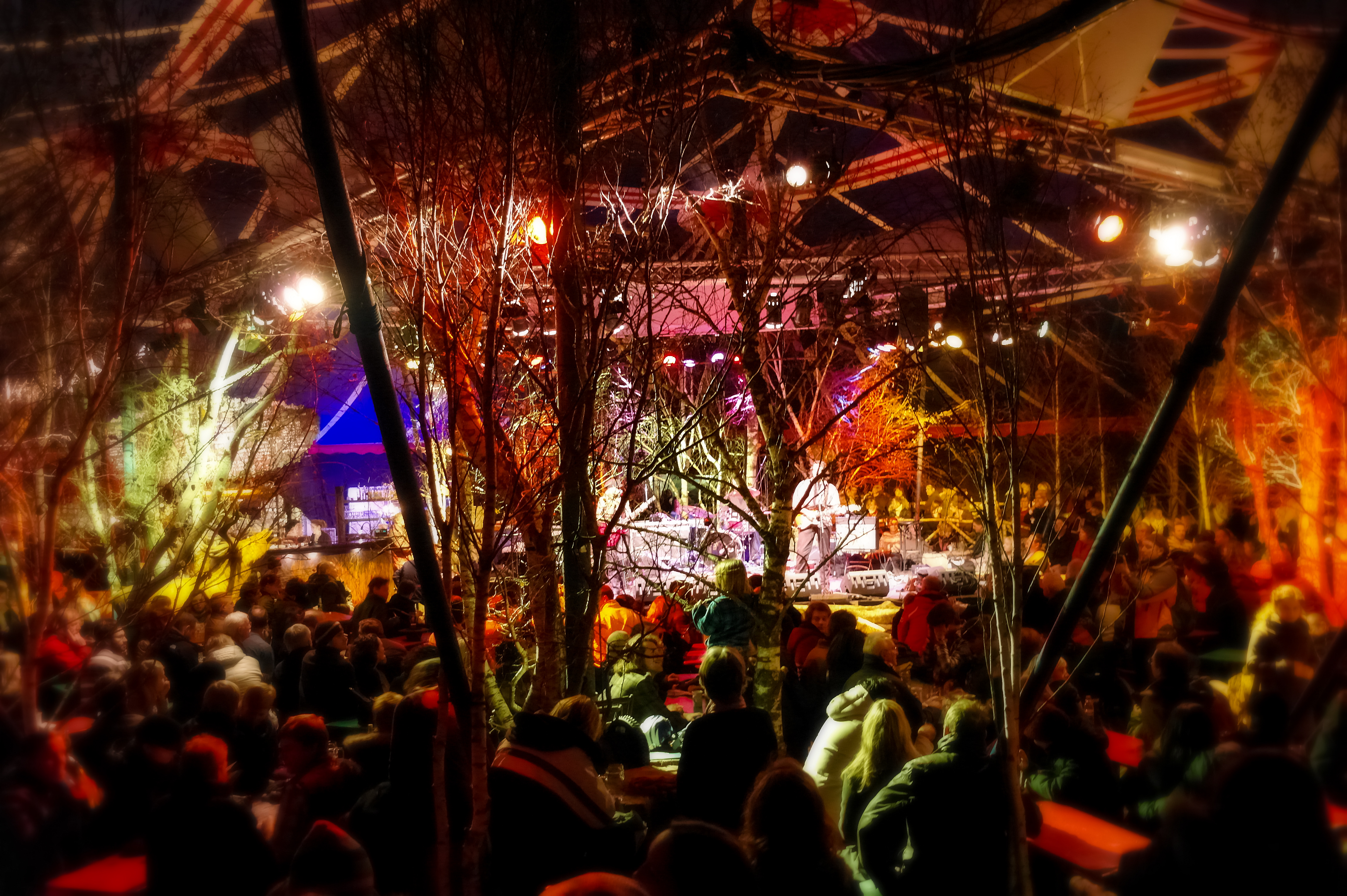
Tollwood Festival

Usually held annually in July and December at Olympia Park. The Tollwood Festival showcases fine and performing arts with live music, and several lanes of booths selling handmade crafts, as well as organic food, mostly fusion cuisine.

==== Oktoberfest ====
At Theresienwiese, Munich's Oktoberfest, the largest beer festival and Volksfest in the world, runs for 16–18 days from the end of September through early October. In the last 200 years the festival has grown to span 85 acres and now welcomes over six million visitors every year. Beer is served from the six major Munich breweries: Augustiner-Bräu, Hacker-Pschorr Brewery, Löwenbräu Brewery, Paulaner Brewery, Spaten-Franziskaner-Bräu, and Staatliches Hofbräuhaus in München. Food must be bought in each tent.

==== Christkindlmarkt ====
The Munich Christkindlmarkt started to evolve in the 14th century. The German Christkindlmarkt reached the desired accomplishment in the 17th century in Nuremberg.

=== Nightlife ===
Nightlife in Munich is located mostly in the boroughs Ludwigsvorstadt-Isarvorstadt, Maxvorstadt, Au-Haidhausen, Berg am Laim and Sendling. Between Sendlinger Tor and Maximiliansplatz, on the edge of the central Altstadt-Lehel district, there is also the so-called Feierbanane (party banana), a roughly banana-shaped unofficial party zone spanning 1.3 km (0.8 mi) along Sonnenstraße, characterized by a high concentration of clubs, bars and restaurants, which became the center of Munich's nightlife in the mid-2000s.

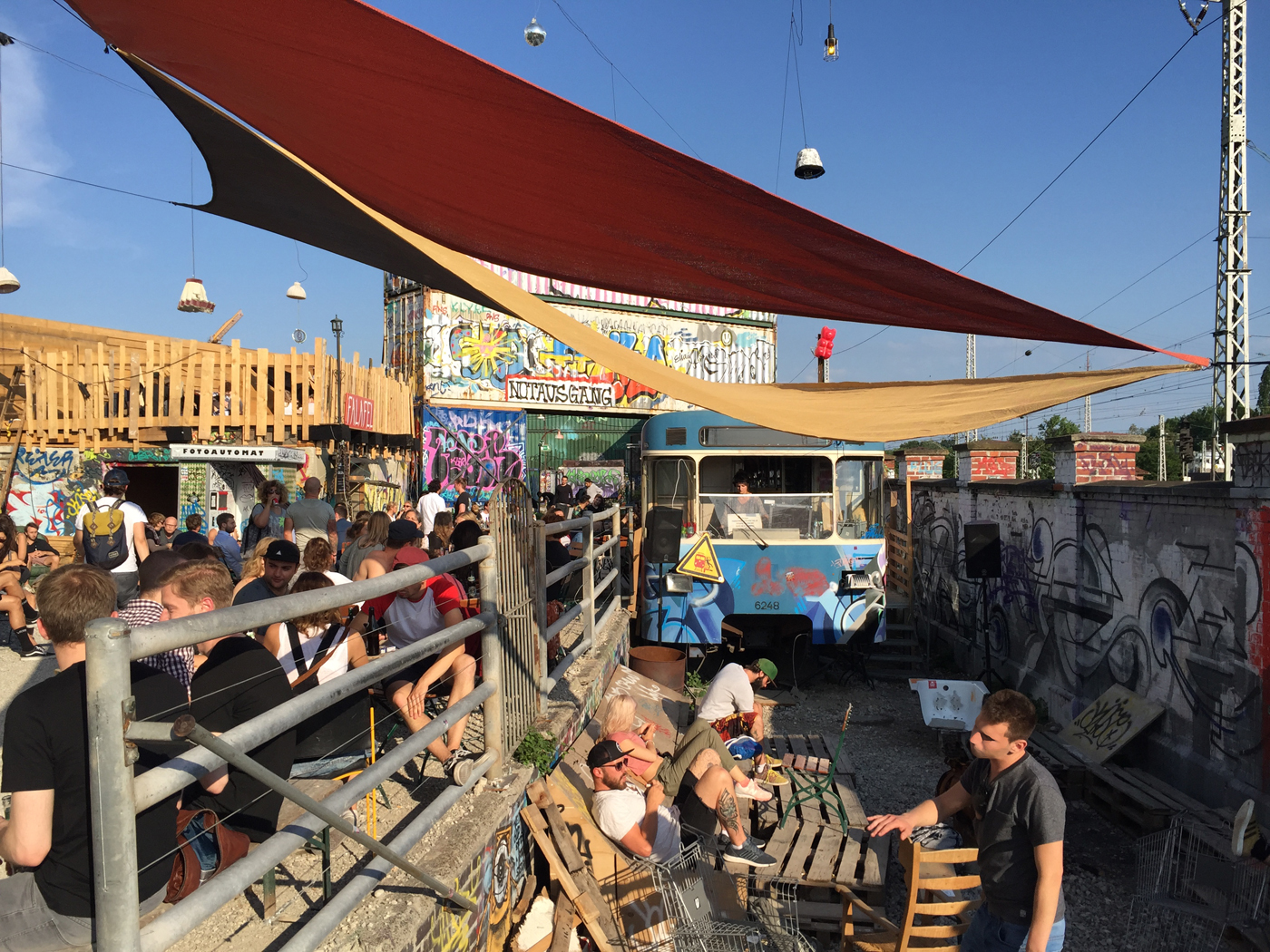
Bahnwärter Thiel

In the 1960s and 1970s, Schwabing was considered a center of nightlife in Germany, with internationally known clubs such as Big Apple, PN hit-house, Domicile, Hot Club, Piper Club, Tiffany, Germany's first large-scale discotheque Blow Up and the underwater nightclub Yellow Submarine, and Munich has been called "New York's big disco sister" in this context. Bars in the Schwabing district of this era include, among many others, Schwabinger 7 and Schwabinger Podium. Since the 1980s, however, Schwabing has lost much of its nightlife activity due to gentrification and the resulting high rents, and the formerly wild artists' and students' quarter developed into one of the city's most coveted and expensive residential districts, attracting affluent citizens with little interest in partying.

Beginning in the 1960s, the Rosa Viertel (pink quarter) developed in the Glockenbachviertel and around Gärtnerplatz, which in the 1980s made Munich "one of the four gayest metropolises in the world" along with San Francisco, New York City and Amsterdam. In particular, the area around Müllerstraße and Hans-Sachs-Straße was characterized by numerous gay bars and nightclubs. One of them was the travesty nightclub Old Mrs. Henderson, where Freddie Mercury, who lived in Munich from 1979 to 1985, filmed the music video for the song "Living on My Own" at his 39th birthday party.

Munich hosted several Love Parades and Mayday Party rave events throughout the 1990s. Munich continues to rave, the local youth scenes are active.

Since the mid-1990s, the Kunstpark Ost and its successor Kultfabrik, a former industrial complex that was converted to a large party area near München Ostbahnhof in Berg am Laim, hosted more than 30 clubs and was especially popular among younger people from the metropolitan area surrounding Munich and tourists. The Kultfabrik was closed at the end of the year 2015 to convert the area into a residential and office area. Apart from the Kultfarbik and the smaller Optimolwerke, there is a wide variety of establishments in the urban parts of nearby Haidhausen. Before the Kunstpark Ost, there had already been an accumulation of internationally known nightclubs in the remains of the abandoned former Munich-Riem Airport.

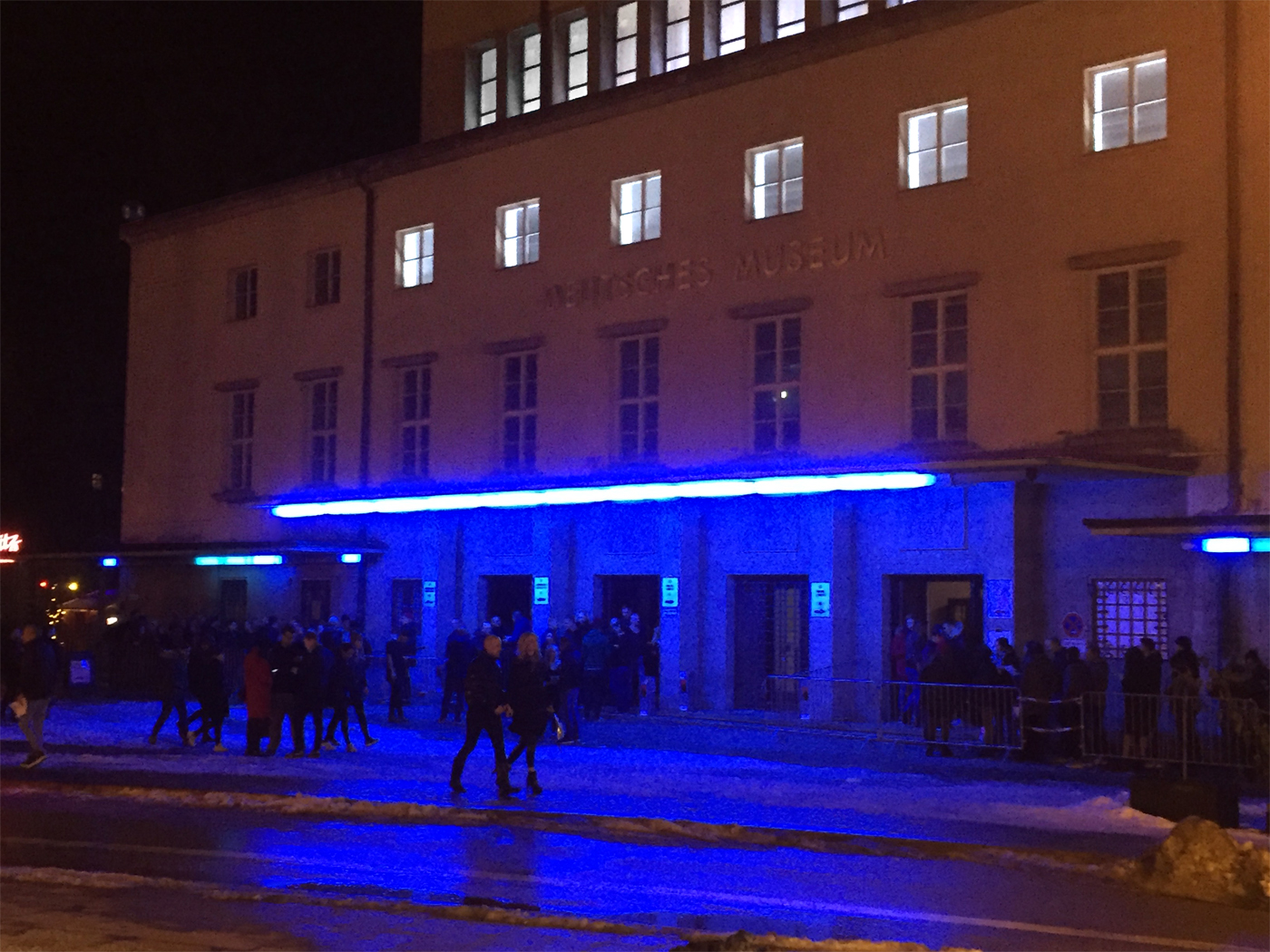
Blitz Club on Museumsinsel

Munich nightlife tends to change dramatically and quickly. Establishments open and close every year, and due to gentrification and the overheated housing market many survive only a few years, while others last longer. Beyond the already mentioned venues of the 1960s and 1970s, nightclubs with international recognition in recent history included Tanzlokal Größenwahn, The Atomic Café and the techno clubs Babalu Club, Ultraschall, KW – Das Heizkraftwerk, Natraj Temple, MMA Club (Mixed Munich Arts), Die Registratur and Bob Beaman. From 1995 to 2001, Munich was also home to the Union Move, one of the largest technoparades in Germany.

Munich has the highest density of music venues of any German city, followed by Hamburg, Cologne and Berlin. Within the city's limits are more than 100 nightclubs and thousands of bars and restaurants.

Popular techno nightclubs are Blitz Club, Harry Klein, Rote Sonne, Bahnwärter Thiel, Pimpernel, Charlie, Palais and Pathos. Popular mixed music clubs are Call me Drella, Wannda Circus, Tonhalle, Backstage, Muffathalle, Ampere, Pacha, P1, Zenith, Minna Thiel and the party ship Alte Utting.

== Economy ==
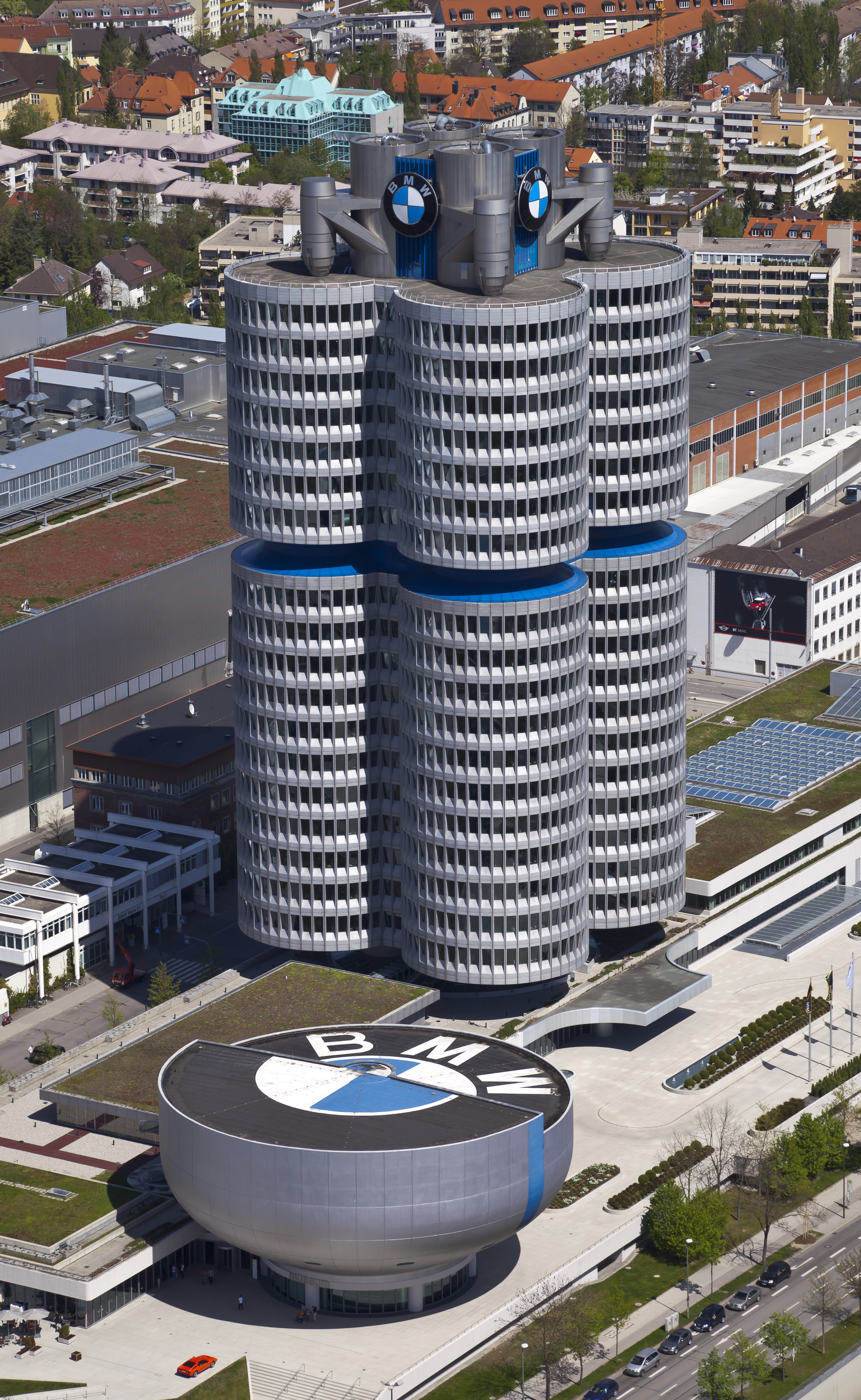
BMW Headquarters building and the bowl-shaped BMW Museum

Munich generated a gross domestic product of €152.0 billion in 2024, according to provisional estimates at current prices. GDP per person in employment was €125,211, compared with €94,135 across Germany. Services accounted for 79.6 per cent of the city's gross value added, while industry and construction contributed 20.4 per cent; manufacturing alone accounted for 16.4 per cent.

Munich had 976,230 employees subject to social security contributions at workplaces within the city on 30 June 2025. Services accounted for 826,064 of these employees, or 84.6 per cent of the total. Public administration and related activities, education, health and social work accounted for 203,241 of these jobs. On the same date, this employment category included 464,210 inward and 214,770 outward commuters. The city's annual average unemployment rate was 5.4 per cent in 2025. Munich's consumer price level was almost 24 per cent above the German average in 2024. The study identifies housing costs as the main source of regional price differences.

Manufacturing accounted for 108,145 jobs subject to social security contributions in June 2025, or 11.1 per cent of the city total. The sector includes machinery and electrical equipment. BMW produces cars in the city, MAN Truck & Bus manufactures heavy lorries, and Siemens Mobility builds locomotives at its Allach works. The aircraft-engine manufacturer MTU Aero Engines also has its headquarters in Munich. Manufacturing establishments belonging to enterprises with at least 50 persons engaged recorded €82.2 billion in turnover in 2024, including €64.9 billion in foreign sales.

Professional, scientific, technical and other business services employed 225,748 workers subject to social security contributions in June 2025, while information and communication employed 111,264 on the same basis. Specialised services accounted for 92 per cent of the city's socially insured information and communication technology workforce in 2023. Financial and insurance activities employed 61,636 socially insured workers in June 2025. Insurance is a longstanding specialism of Munich's financial sector. Allianz and Munich Re are based in the city.

The Messe München exhibition centre in Riem

Publishing, broadcasting and film production are part of the city's cultural and creative industries, alongside advertising, software and games. The Bavaria Film Studios are located in the suburb of Grünwald. Munich is home to the Süddeutsche Zeitung, one of Germany's biggest daily newspapers. The regional public-service broadcaster, BR, a member of Germany's largest public broadcasting network, ARD, is based in the city, while the largest commercial network, Pro7-Sat1 Media AG, is headquartered in the suburb of Unterföhring.

Universities and research institutions contribute to the city's knowledge base and attract skilled workers. Entrepreneurship centres at the city's universities help turn applied research into products and business models; support organisations in the wider region include UnternehmerTUM and the Social Entrepreneurship Academy.

In 2025, Munich recorded 9.3 million guest arrivals and 19.7 million overnight stays in accommodation establishments with at least ten guest beds and campsites with at least ten pitches. Trade fairs at Messe München generate demand for accommodation, catering and transport services. A study commissioned by Messe München estimated that events on its grounds generated €2.33 billion in direct, indirect and induced turnover within the city in an average year of the 2024–25 exhibition cycle. Oktoberfest also draws visitors to the city.

== Education ==
=== Colleges and universities ===
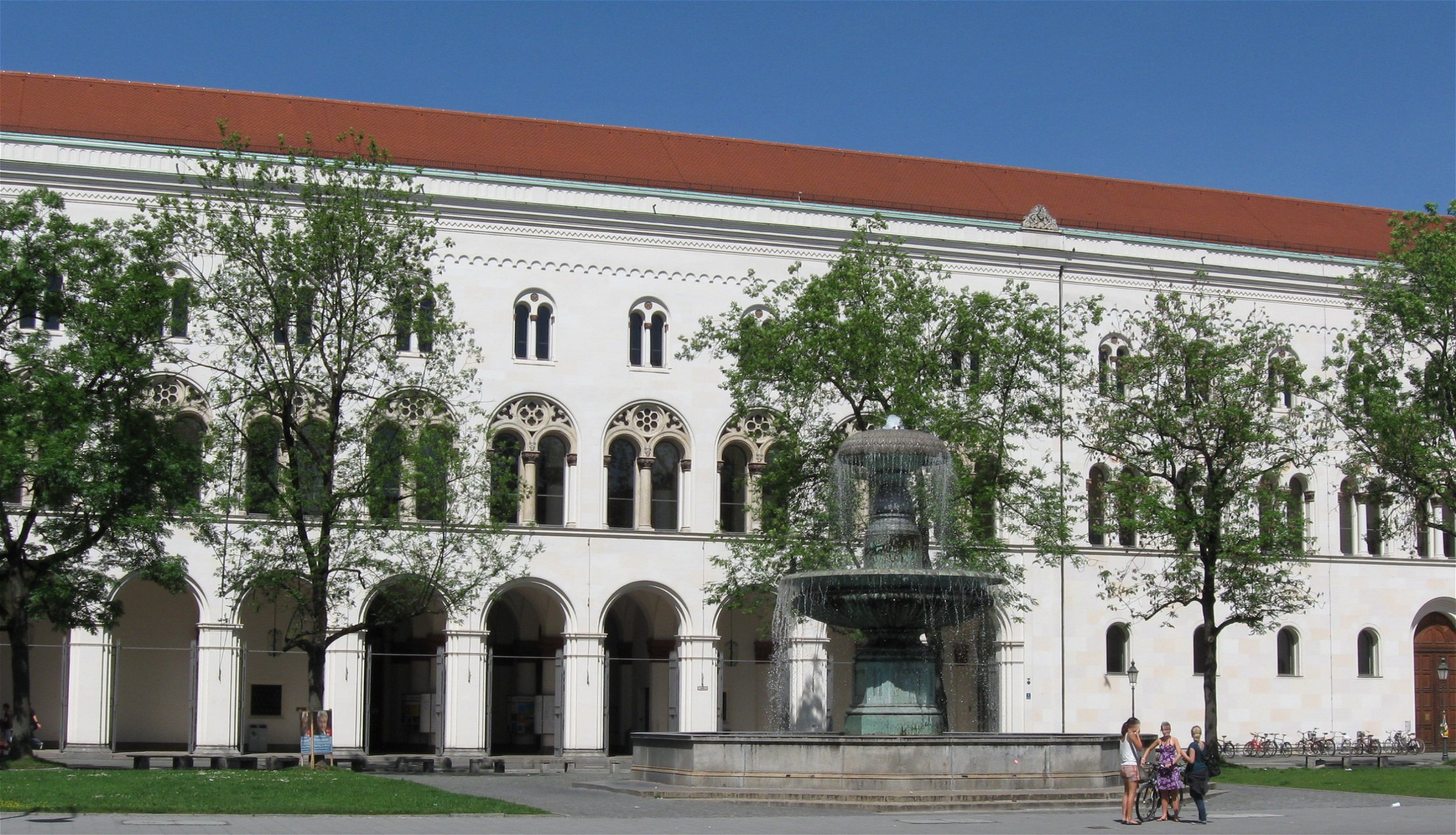
Main building of LMU Munich

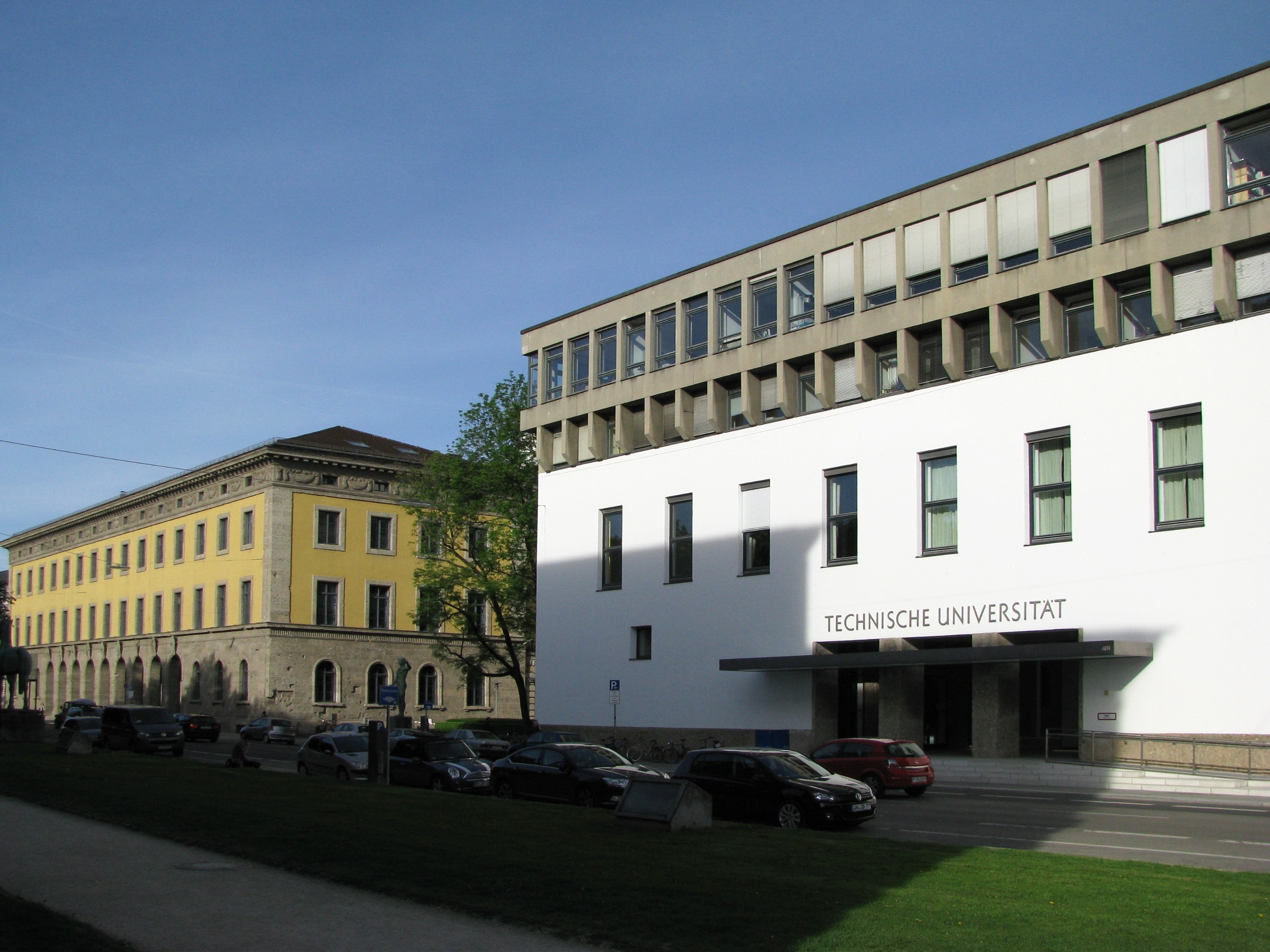
Main building of the Technical University

Munich is a leading location for science and research with a long list of Nobel Prize laureates from Wilhelm Röntgen in 1901 to Theodor W. Hänsch in 2005.

LMU Munich and the Technical University of Munich (TUM), were two of the first three German universities to be awarded the title elite university by a selection committee composed of academics and members of the Ministries of Education and Research of the Federation and the German states (Länder).

- LMU Munich, founded in 1472 in Ingolstadt, moved to Munich in 1826
- Technical University of Munich (TUM), founded in 1868
- Akademie der Bildenden Künste München, founded in 1808
- University of the Bundeswehr Munich, founded in 1973 (located in Neubiberg)
- Deutsche Journalistenschule, founded in 1959
- Bayerische Akademie für Außenwirtschaft, founded in 1989
- Hochschule für Musik und Theater München, founded in 1830
- International Max Planck Research School for Molecular and Cellular Life Sciences, founded in 2005
- International School of Management, Germany, founded in 1990
- Katholische Stiftungsfachhochschule München, founded in 1971
- Munich Business School (MBS), founded in 1991
- Munich Intellectual Property Law Center (MIPLC), founded in 2003
- Munich School of Philosophy, founded in 1925 in Pullach, moved to Munich in 1971
- Munich School of Political Science, founded in 1950
- Munich University of Applied Sciences (HM), founded in 1971
- New European College, founded in 2014
- Ukrainian Free University, founded in 1921 (from 1945 – in Munich)
- University of Television and Film Munich (Hochschule für Fernsehen und Film), founded in 1966

=== Primary and secondary schools ===
Notable Gymnasien in Munich include the Maria-Theresia-Gymnasium, the Luitpold Gymnasium, the Wilhelmsgymnasium, as well as the Wittelsbacher Gymnasium. Munich has several notable international schools, including Lycée Jean Renoir, the Japanische Internationale Schule München, the Bavarian International School, the Munich International School, and the European School, Munich.

=== Max Planck Society ===
The Max Planck Society, a government funded non-profit research organization, has its administrative headquarters in Munich.

=== Fraunhofer Society ===
The Fraunhofer Society, the German government funded research organization for applied research, has its headquarters in Munich.

=== Other research institutes ===
- Botanische Staatssammlung München, a notable herbarium
- Ifo Institute for Economic Research, theoretical and applied research in economics and finance
- Doerner Institute
- European Southern Observatory
- Helmholtz Zentrum München
- Zoologische Staatssammlung München
- German Aerospace Center (DLR), Oberpfaffenhofen bei München

== Transport ==
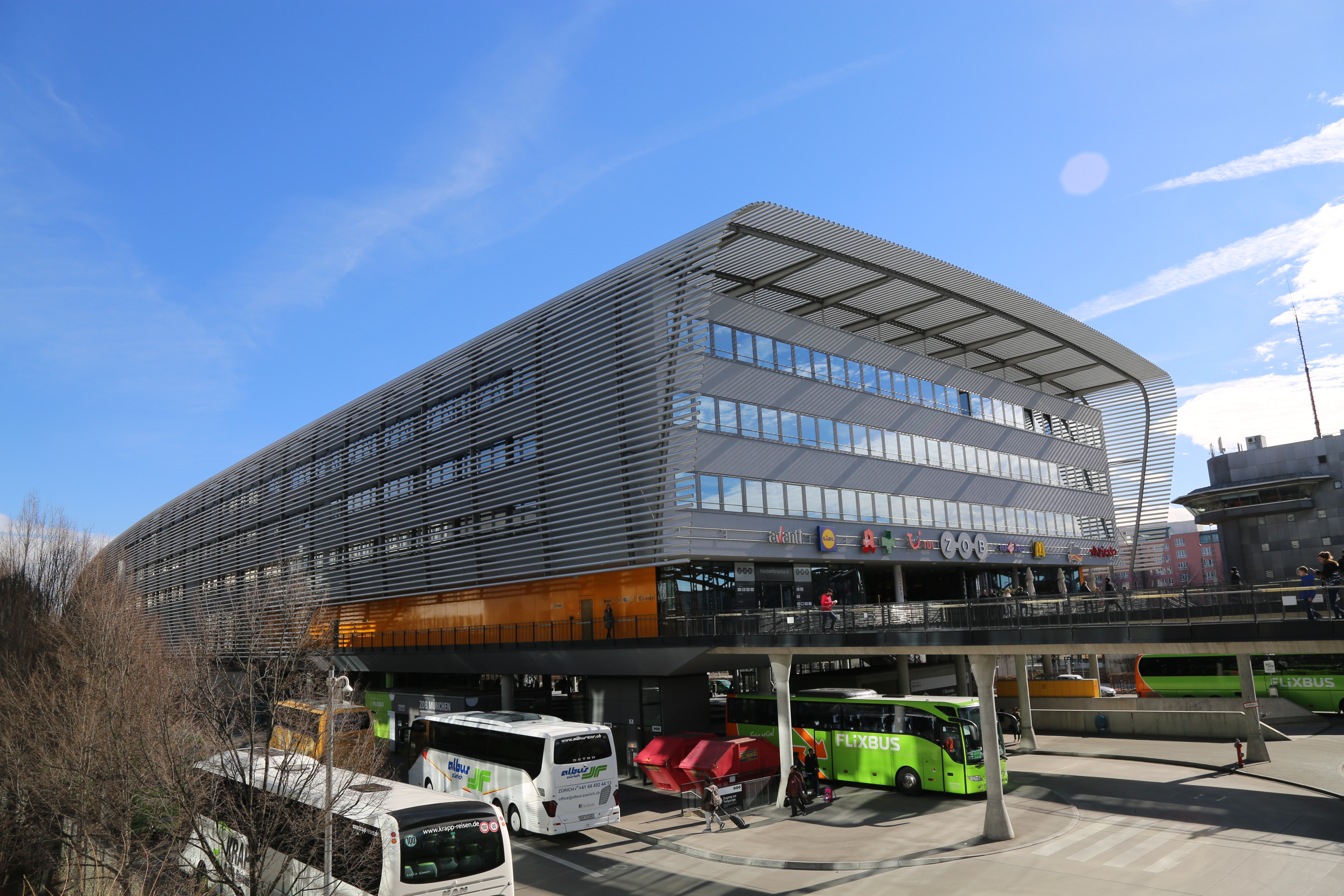
ZOB Muenchen (long-distance bus terminal)

Munich has an extensive public transport system consisting of an underground metro, trams, buses and high-speed rail. In 2015, the transport modal share in Munich was 38 percent public transport, 25 percent car, 23 percent walking, and 15 percent bicycle. Its public transport system delivered 566 million passenger trips that year.

Munich is the hub of a developed regional transportation system, including the second-largest airport in Germany and the Berlin–Munich high-speed railway, which connects Munich to the German capital city with a journey time of about 4 hours. Flixmobility which offers intercity coach service is headquartered in Munich.

The trade fair Transport Logistic is held every two years at the Neue Messe München (Messe München International).

=== Public transport ===
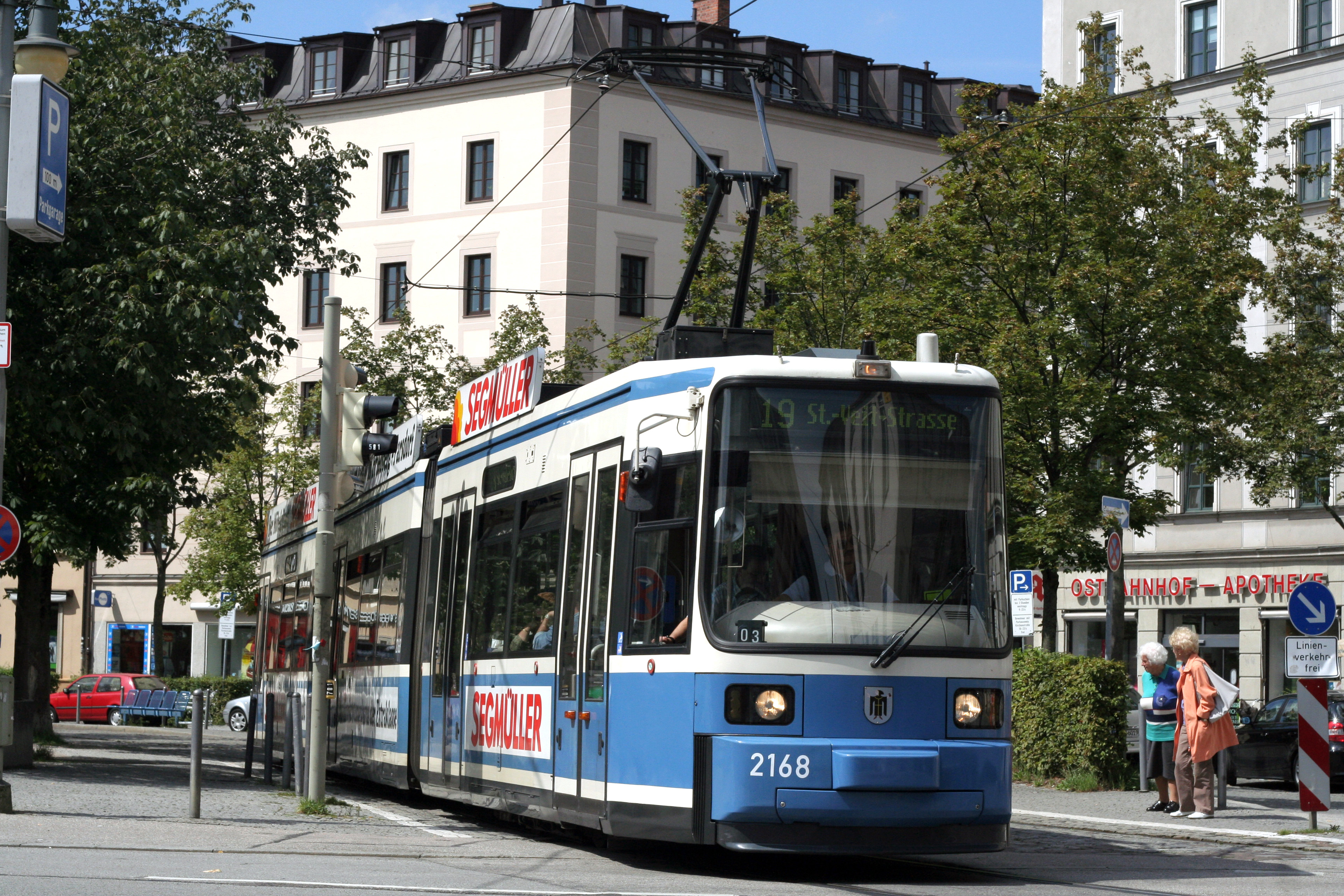
A class R2 Straßenbahn (Tram) on route 19 at Ostbahnhof

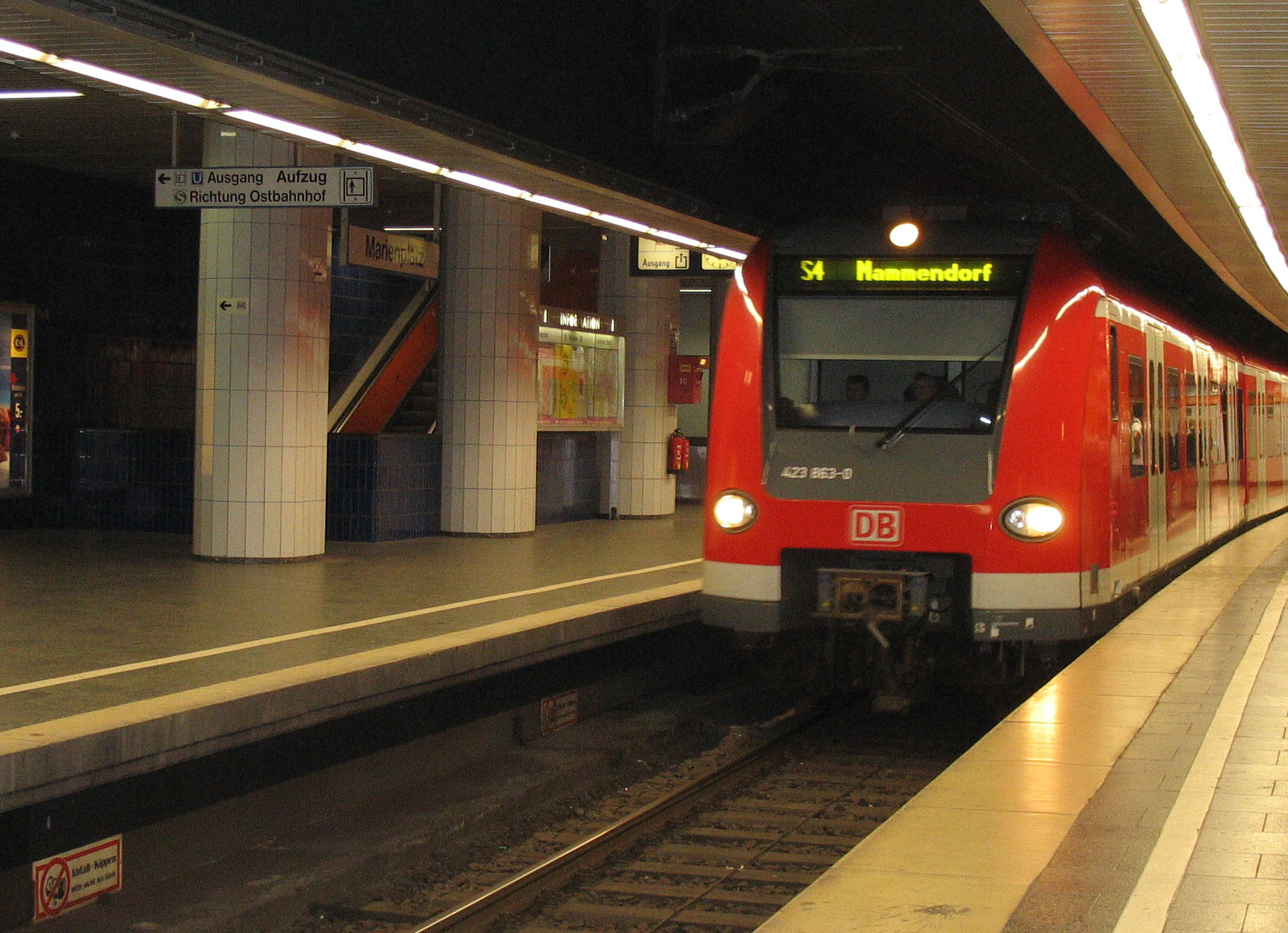
Munich's S-Bahn at the Marienplatz station

For its urban population of 2.6 million people, Munich and its closest suburbs have a comprehensive network of public transport incorporating the Munich U-Bahn, the Munich S-Bahn, trams and buses. The system is supervised by the Munich Transport and Tariff Association (Münchner Verkehrs- und Tarifverbund). The Munich tramway is the oldest existing public transportation system in the city, which has been in operation since 1876. Munich also has an extensive network of bus lines. The average amount of time people spend commuting to and from work with public transit in Munich on a weekday is 56 min.

The extensive network of subway and tram lines assists and complement pedestrian movement in the city centre. The 700m-long Kaufinger Straße, which starts near the Main train station, forms a pedestrian east–west spine that traverses almost the entire centre. Major spines and many smaller streets cover an extensive area of the centre that can be enjoyed on foot and bike. These attributes result from applying the principle of filtered permeability. Pedestrian and bike paths, which permeate the entire Munich city centre, go through public squares and open spaces for enjoyment. Munich city centre was subject to urban planning and has a comprehensive model for laying out neighborhoods and districts according to grid plan.

=== Cycling ===
Cycling has a strong presence in the city and is recognized as a good alternative. The growing number of bicycle lanes are widely used throughout the year. Cycle paths can be found alongside the majority of sidewalks and streets, although the newer or renovated ones are much easier to tell apart from pavements than older ones. A modern bike hire system is available within the area bounded by the Mittlerer Ring.

=== Cultural history trails and bicycle routes ===
Since 2001, historically interesting places in Munich can be explored via the List of cultural history trails in Munich (KulturGeschichtsPfade). Sign-posted cycle routes are the Outer Äußere Radlring (outer cycle route) and the RadlRing München.

=== Munich Central Train Station ===
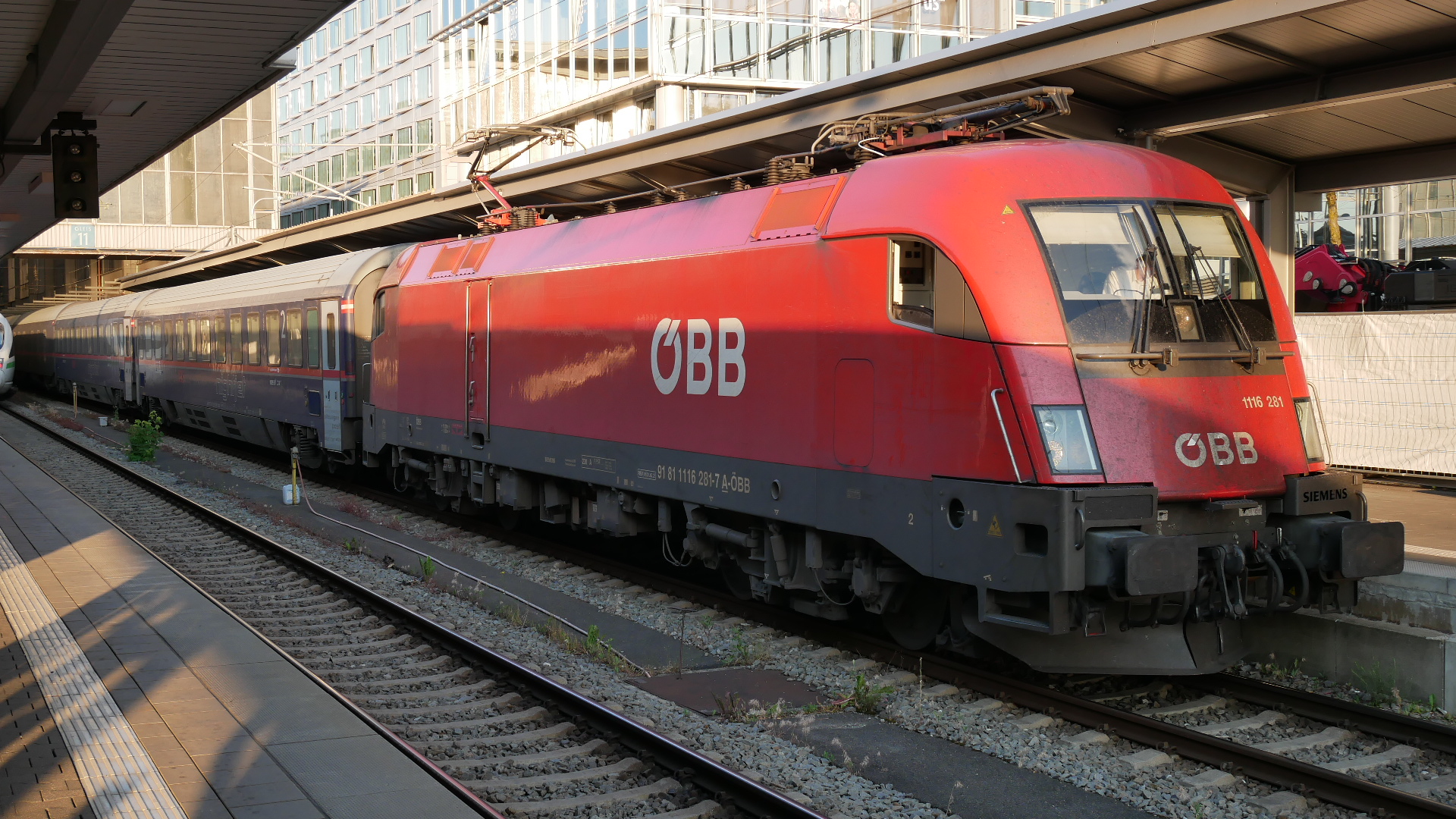
Austrian Nightjet train in München Hauptbahnhof

Munich Central Train Station (München Hauptbahnhof) is the central railway station located in the city centre and is the long-distance station in Munich.

Munich Central Train Station serves about 450,000 passengers a day, which puts it on par with other large stations in Germany. Munich Central Train Station alongside München Ost railway station are two of the 21 stations in Germany classified by Deutsche Bahn as a category 1 station.

The central mainline station is a terminal station with 32 platforms. The subterranean S-Bahn with 2 platforms and U-Bahn stations with 6 platforms are through stations.

Intercity-Express (ICE) and EuroCity-Express (ECE; Munich–Bregenz–Zurich) trains – and starting in 2026 also TGV trains (Munich–Paris) – stop at Munich Central Train Station. InterCity (IC) and EuroCity (EC) trains to destinations east of Munich also stop at the München Ost railway station. Munich is connected to Nuremberg via Ingolstadt by the Nuremberg–Munich high-speed railway and Berlin–Munich high-speed railway.

The old air raid shelter next to platform 11 of Munich Central Train Station was an important distribution point for guest workers (Gastarbeiter) between 1960 and 1973. At peak more than 1,000 guest workers arrived per day, in total 1.8 million guest workers passed through Munich Central Train Station.

=== Autobahns ===
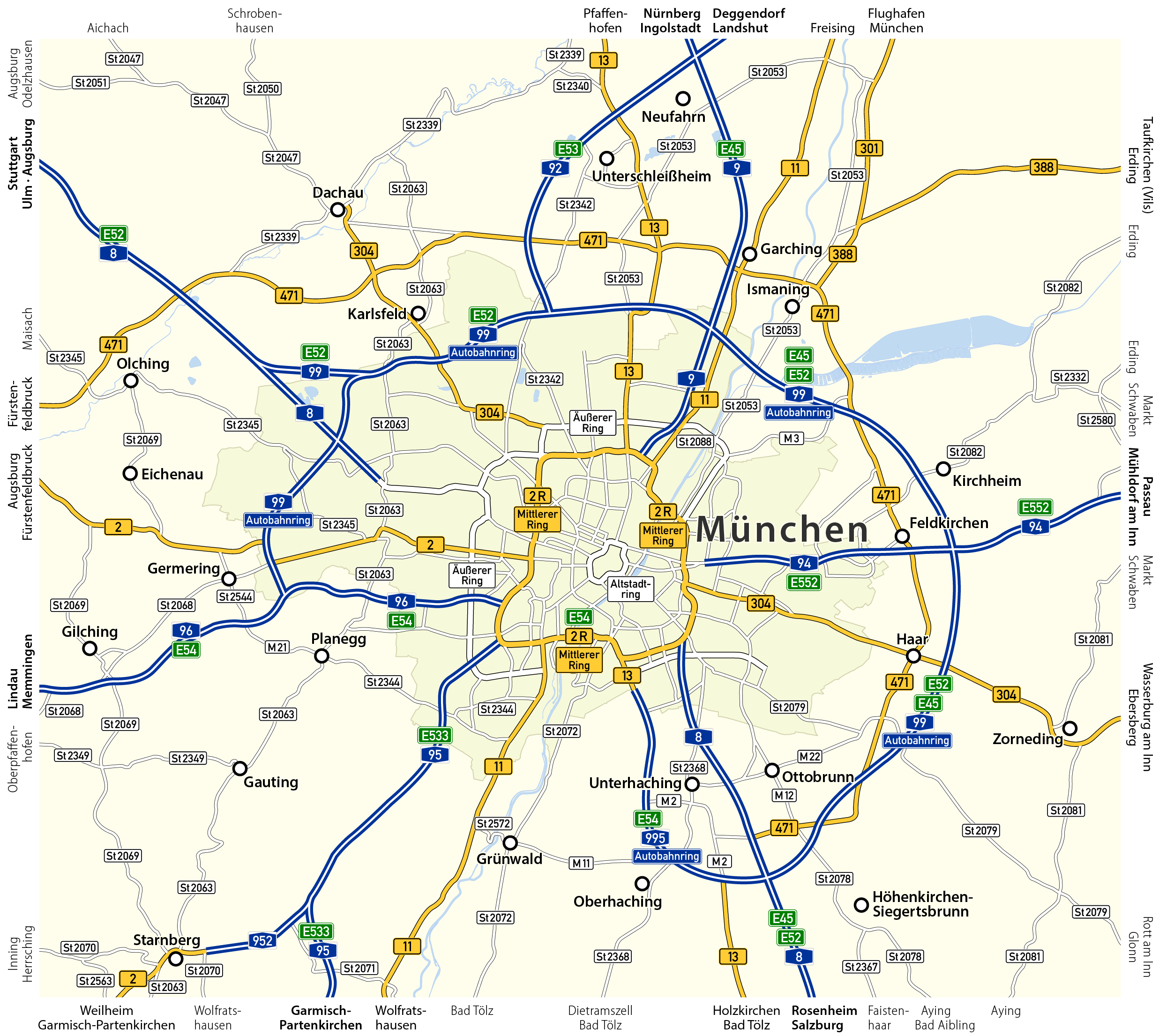
Munich motorway network

Munich is an integral part of the Autobahn network of southern Germany. Motorways from Stuttgart (W), Nuremberg, Frankfurt and Berlin (N), Deggendorf and Passau (E), Salzburg and Innsbruck (SE), Garmisch Partenkirchen (S) and Lindau (SW) terminate at Munich, allowing direct access to the different parts of Germany, Austria and Italy.

Traffic is often very heavy in and around Munich. Traffic congestion are commonplace at the beginning and end of major Bavarian holidays. There are few "green waves" or roundabouts, and an abundance of construction sites.

Munich has introduced an environmental zone and was among the first German cities to require a green sticker for vehicles, these are a requirement when entering the city or driving in the wider surrounding area.

=== Air ===
==== Munich International Airport ====
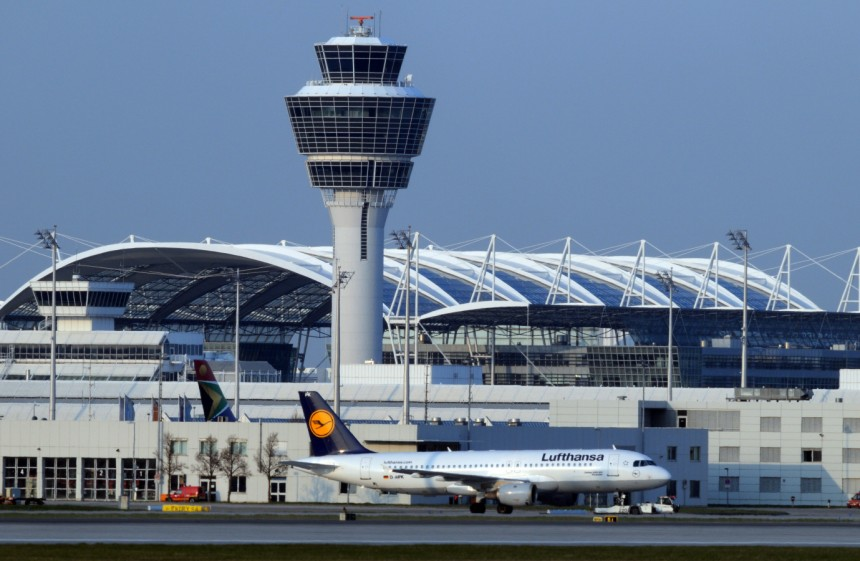
Munich International Airport (MUC)

Franz Josef Strauss International Airport (IATA: MUC, ICAO: EDDM) is the second-largest airport in Germany and seventh-largest in Europe after London Heathrow, Paris Charles de Gaulle, Frankfurt, Amsterdam, Madrid and Istanbul Atatürk. It is used by about 46 million passengers a year, and lies some 30 km (19 mi) north east of the city centre. It replaced the smaller Munich-Riem Airport in 1992. The airport can be reached by suburban train lines from the city. From the main railway station the journey takes 40–45 minutes. A magnetic levitation train (called Transrapid), which was to have run at speeds of up to 400 km/h (249 mph) from the central station to the airport in a travel time of 10 minutes, had been approved, but was cancelled in March 2008 because of cost escalation and after heavy protests. Lufthansa opened its second hub at the airport when Terminal 2 was opened in 2003.

==== Other airports ====
In 2008, the Bavarian state government granted a licence to expand Oberpfaffenhofen Air Station located west of Munich, for commercial use. These plans were opposed by many residents in the Oberpfaffenhofen area as well as other branches of local government, including the city of Munich, which took the case to court. However, in October 2009, the permit allowing up to 9725 business flights per year to depart from or land at Oberpfaffenhofen was confirmed by a regional judge.

Despite being 110 km (68 mi) from Munich, Memmingen Airport has been advertised as Airport Munich West. After 2005, passenger traffic of nearby Augsburg Airport was relocated to Munich Airport, leaving the Augsburg region of Bavaria without an air passenger airport within close reach.

== Sports ==
=== Football ===
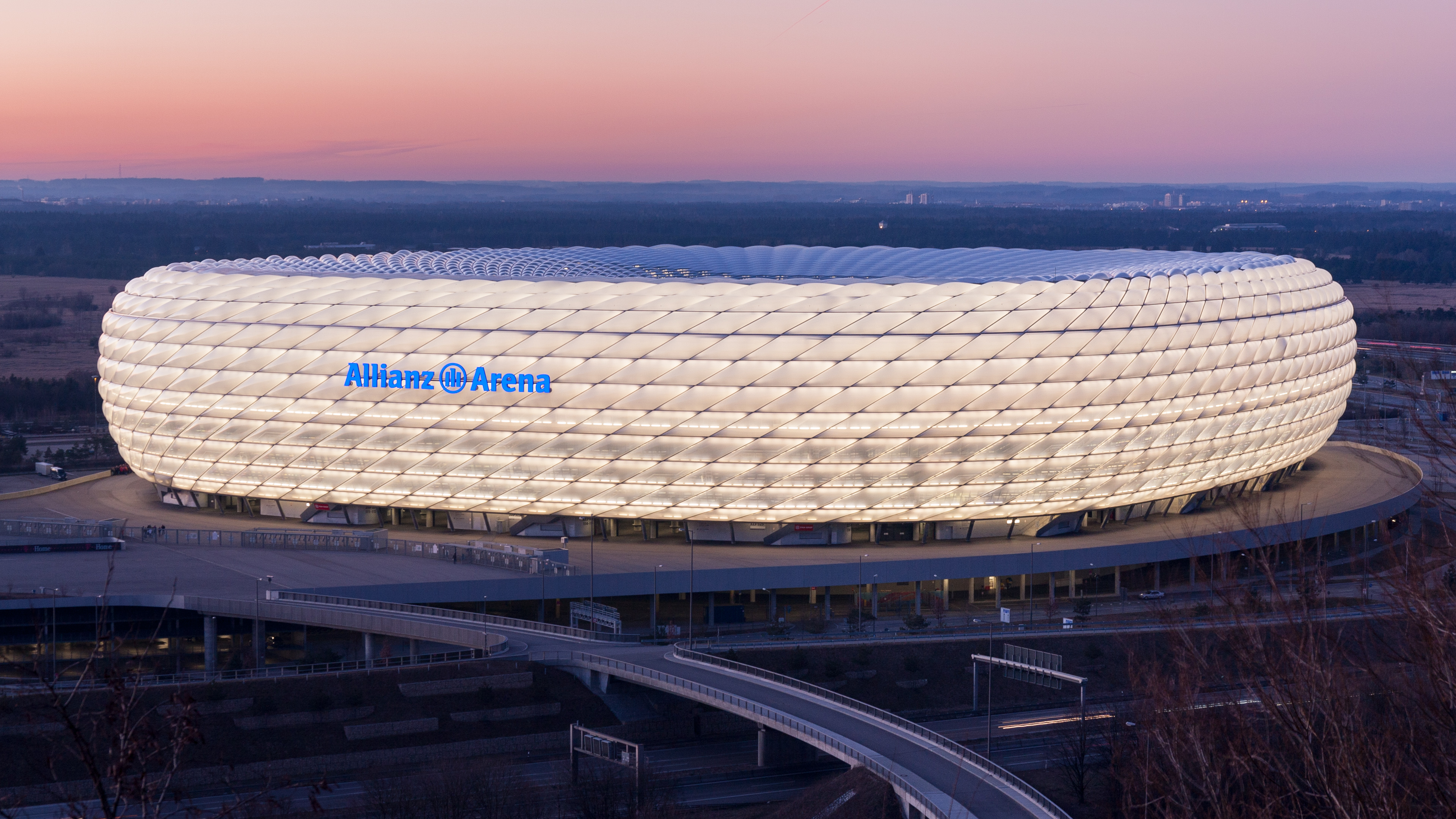
Allianz Arena is the second-largest stadium in Germany and the home stadium of FC Bayern Munich.

Munich is home to several professional Association football teams including the FC Bayern Munich. Other notable clubs include 1860 Munich, who currently play in the 3. Liga. Noticeably, FC Bayern Munich is the most successful club in Germany and it is also very reputed across Europe and the world. Munich hosted matches in the 2006 FIFA World Cup.

=== Basketball ===
FC Bayern Munich Basketball is currently playing in the Beko Basket Bundesliga. The city hosted the final stages of the FIBA EuroBasket 1993, where the German national basketball team won the gold medal.

=== Ice hockey ===
The city's ice hockey club is EHC Red Bull München who play in the Deutsche Eishockey Liga. The team has won four DEL Championships, in 2016, 2017, 2018 and 2023.

=== Olympics ===
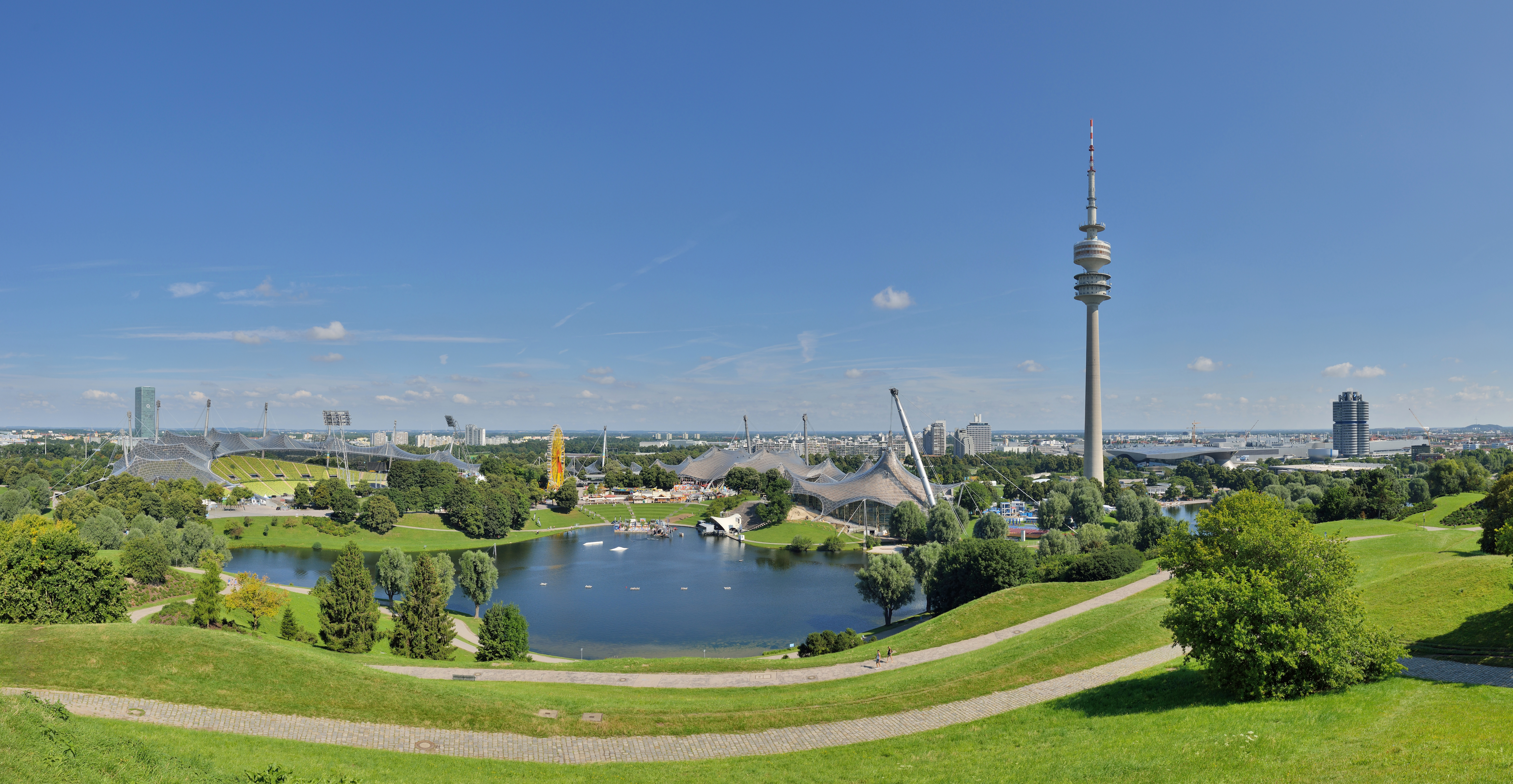
Olympiasee in the Olympiapark

Munich hosted the 1972 Summer Olympics; the Munich massacre took place in the Olympic village. It was one of the host cities for the 2006 Football World Cup, which was not held in Munich's Olympic Stadium, but in a new football specific stadium, the Allianz Arena. Munich bid to host the 2018 Winter Olympic Games, but lost to Pyeongchang.

In October 2025, Munich citizens voted heavily (66%) in favor of their city's bid to host the 2036, 2040, or 2044 Olympic Games. The pro-bid campaign focused on ecological and sustainable solutions, social housing, and leveraging existing infrastructure.

=== Road running ===
Regular annual road running events in Munich are the Munich Marathon in October, the Stadtlauf end of June, the company run B2Run in July, the New Year's Run on 31 December, the Spartan Race Sprint, the Olympia Alm Crosslauf and the Bestzeitenmarathon.

=== Swimming ===
Public sporting facilities in Munich include ten indoor swimming pools and eight outdoor swimming pools, which are operated by the Munich City Utilities (SWM) communal company. Popular indoor swimming pools include the Olympia Schwimmhalle of the 1972 Summer Olympics, the wave pool Cosimawellenbad, as well as the Müllersches Volksbad which was built in 1901. Further, swimming within Munich's city limits is also possible in several artificial lakes such as for example the Riemer See or the Langwieder lake district.

=== River surfing ===
River surfing is a popular sport in Munich. The Flosskanal wave in the south of Munich is less challenging. A well visited surfing spot for experienced surfers is the Eisbach standing wave, where the annual Munich Surf Open is celebrated on the last Saturday of July.

== International relations ==
=== Twin towns and sister cities ===
Munich is twinned with:

- Edinburgh, Scotland, UK (1954)
- Verona, Italy (1960)
- Bordeaux, France (1964)
- Sapporo, Japan (1972)
- Cincinnati, United States (1989)
- Kyiv, Ukraine (1989)
- Harare, Zimbabwe (1996)
- Beersheba, Israel (2021)

== Around Munich ==
=== Nearby towns ===
The Munich agglomeration sprawls across the plain of the Alpine foothills comprising about 2.6 million inhabitants. Several smaller traditional Bavarian towns and cities like Dachau, Freising, Erding, Starnberg, Landshut and Moosburg are today part of the Greater Munich Region, formed by Munich and the surrounding districts, making up the Munich Metropolitan Region, which has a population of about 6 million people.

=== Recreation ===
South of Munich, there are numerous nearby freshwater lakes such as Lake Starnberg, Ammersee, Chiemsee, Walchensee, Kochelsee, Tegernsee, Schliersee, Simssee, Staffelsee, Wörthsee, Kirchsee and the Osterseen (Easter Lakes), which are popular among Munich residents for recreation, swimming and watersports and can be quickly reached by car and a few also by Munich's S-Bahn.

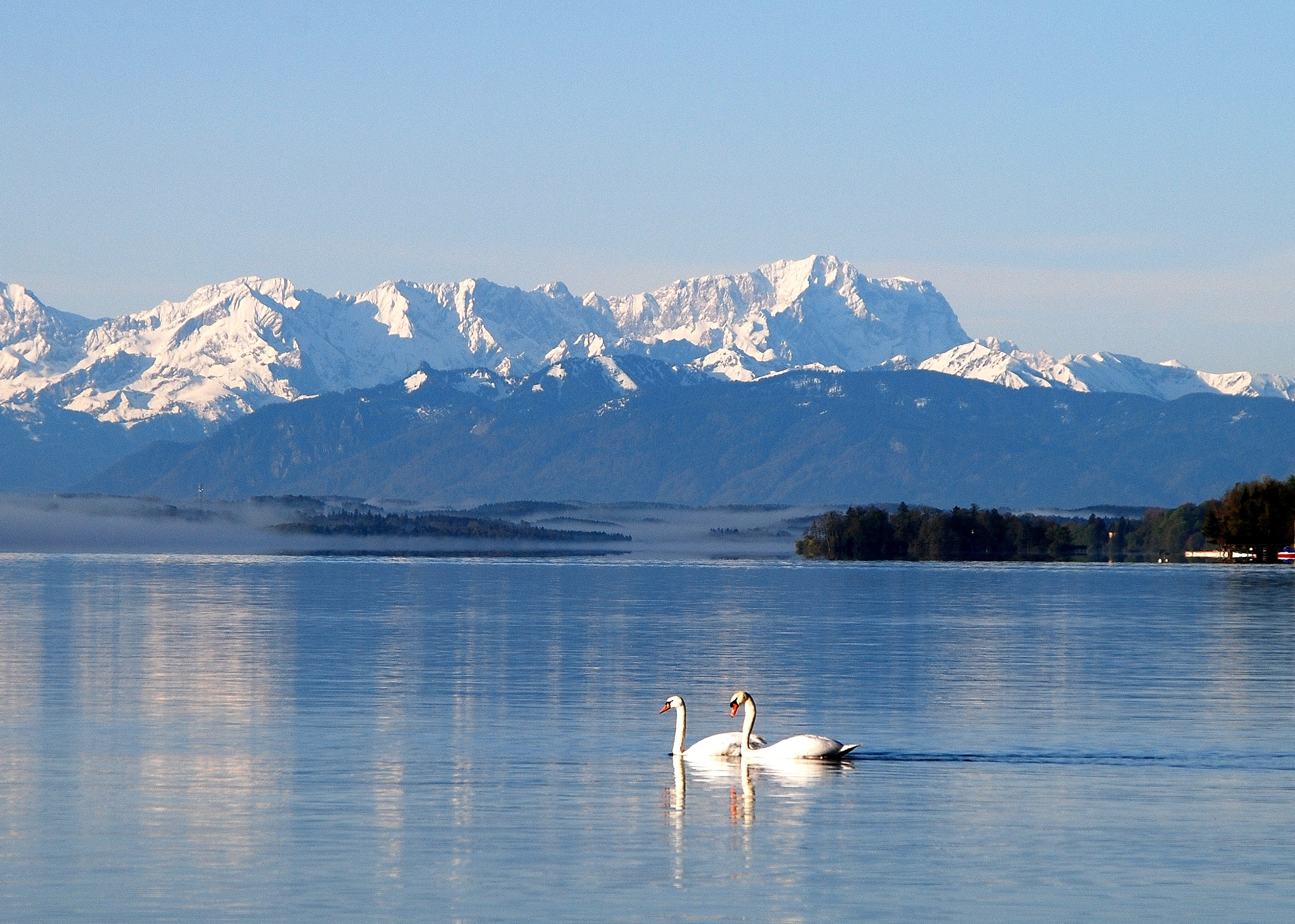
Lake Starnberg

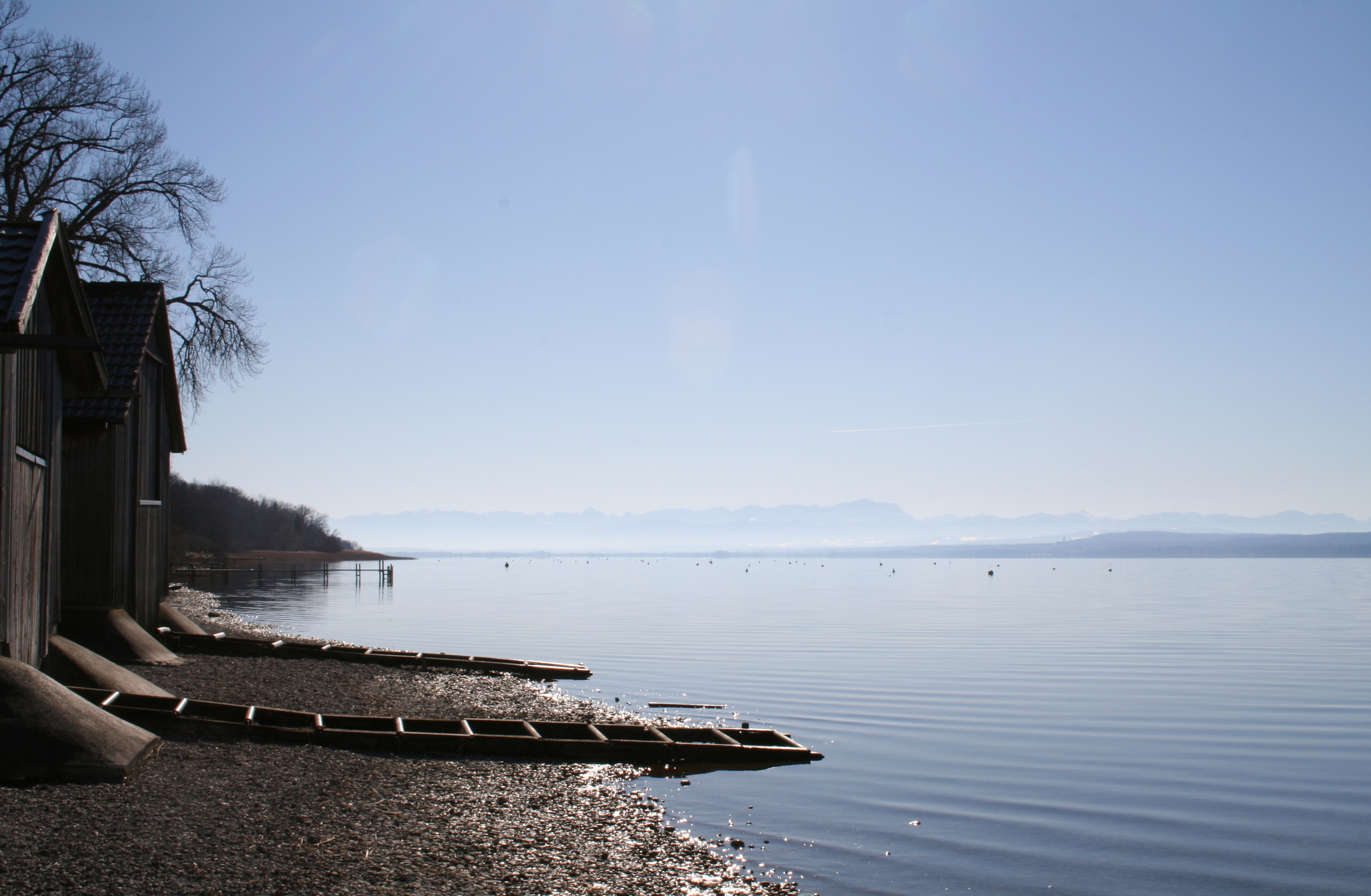
Ammersee

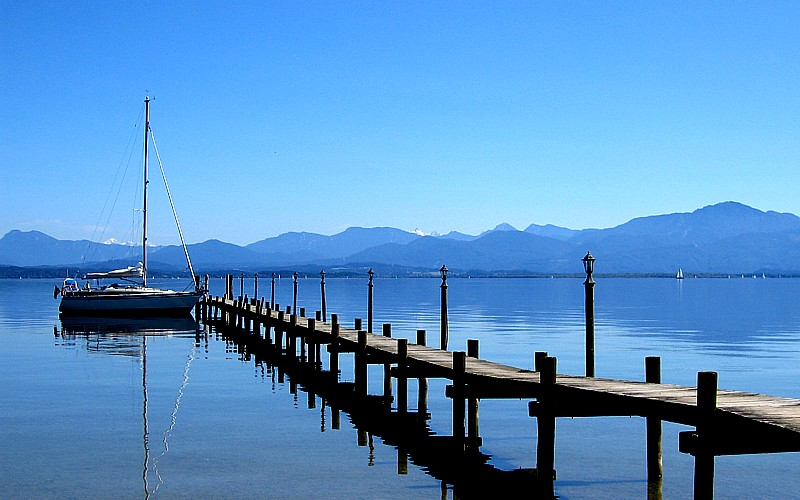
Chiemsee

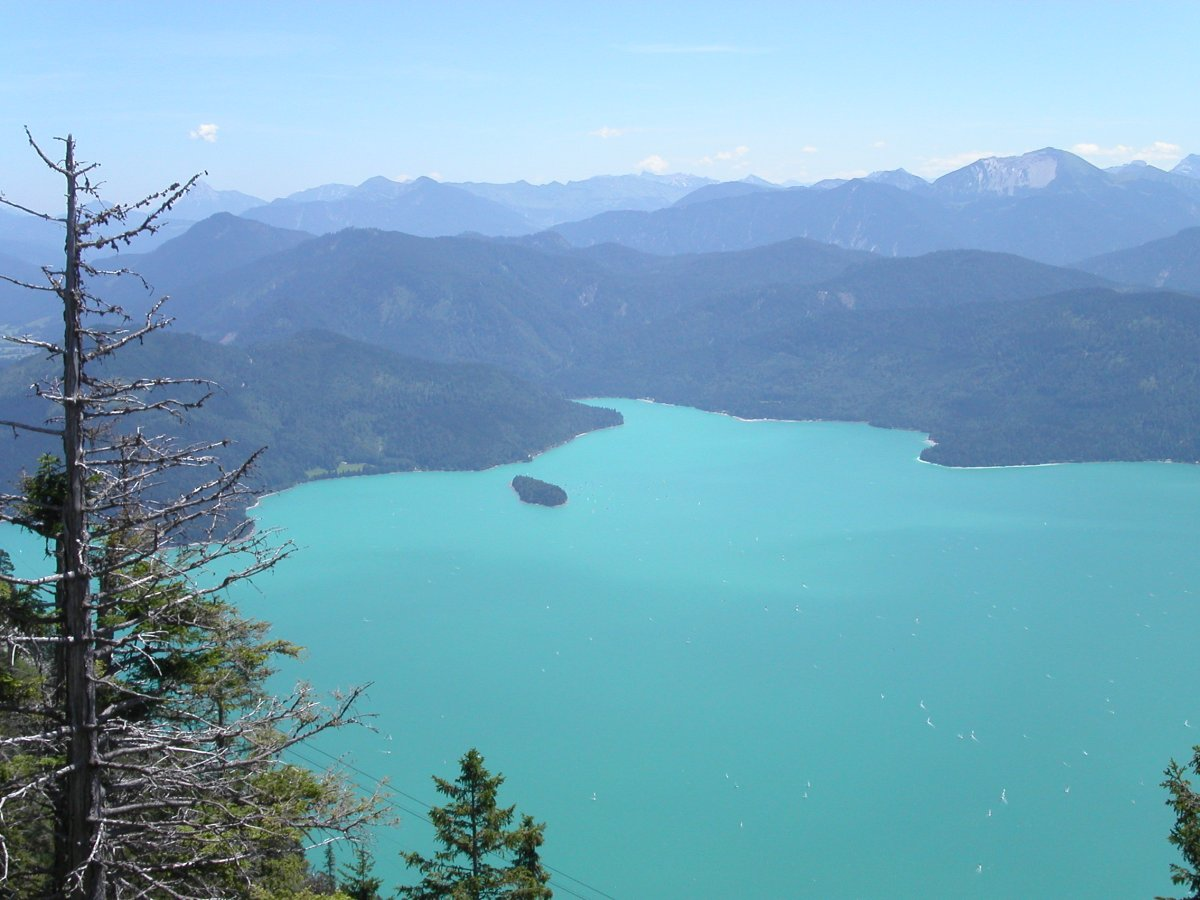
Walchensee

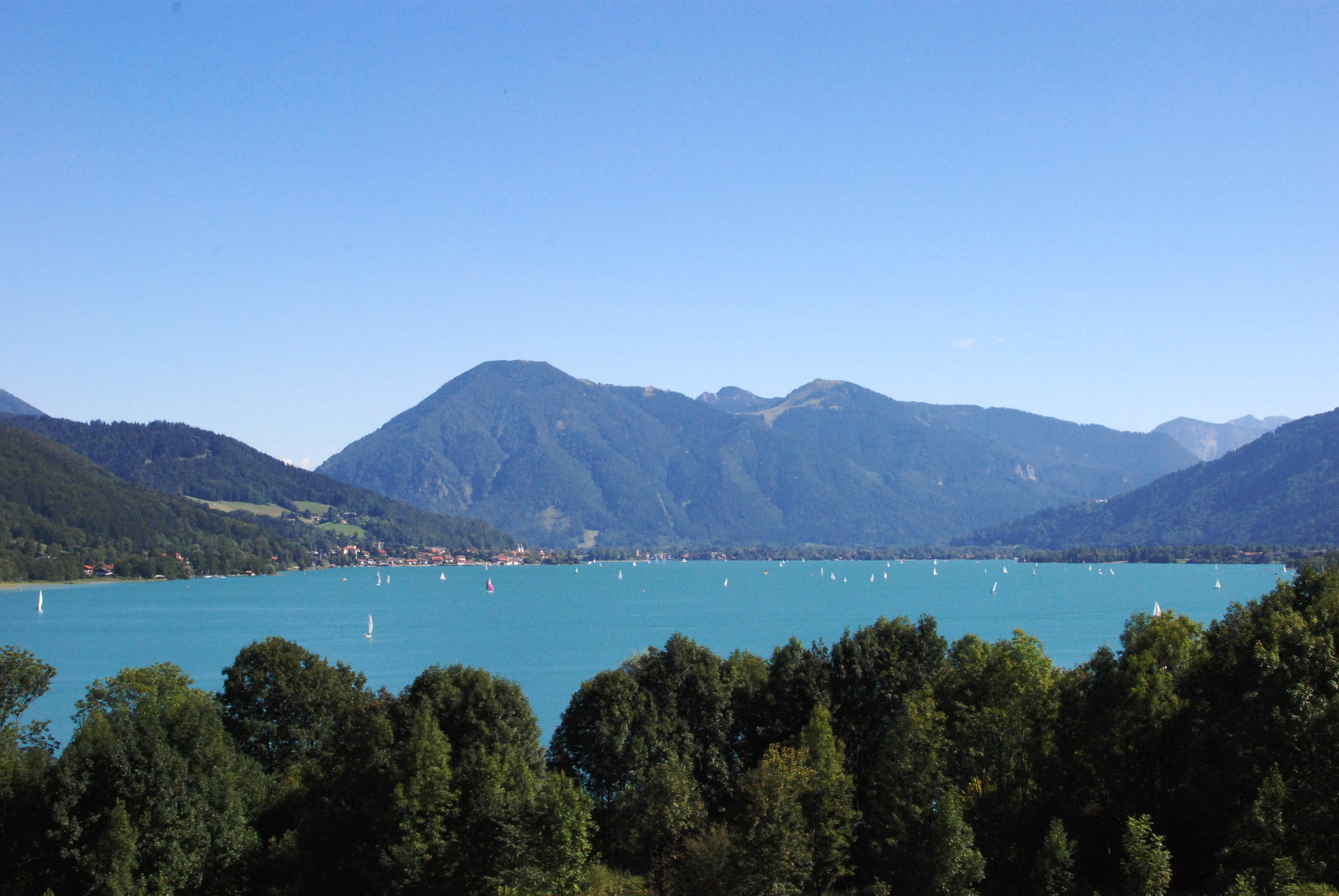
Tegernsee

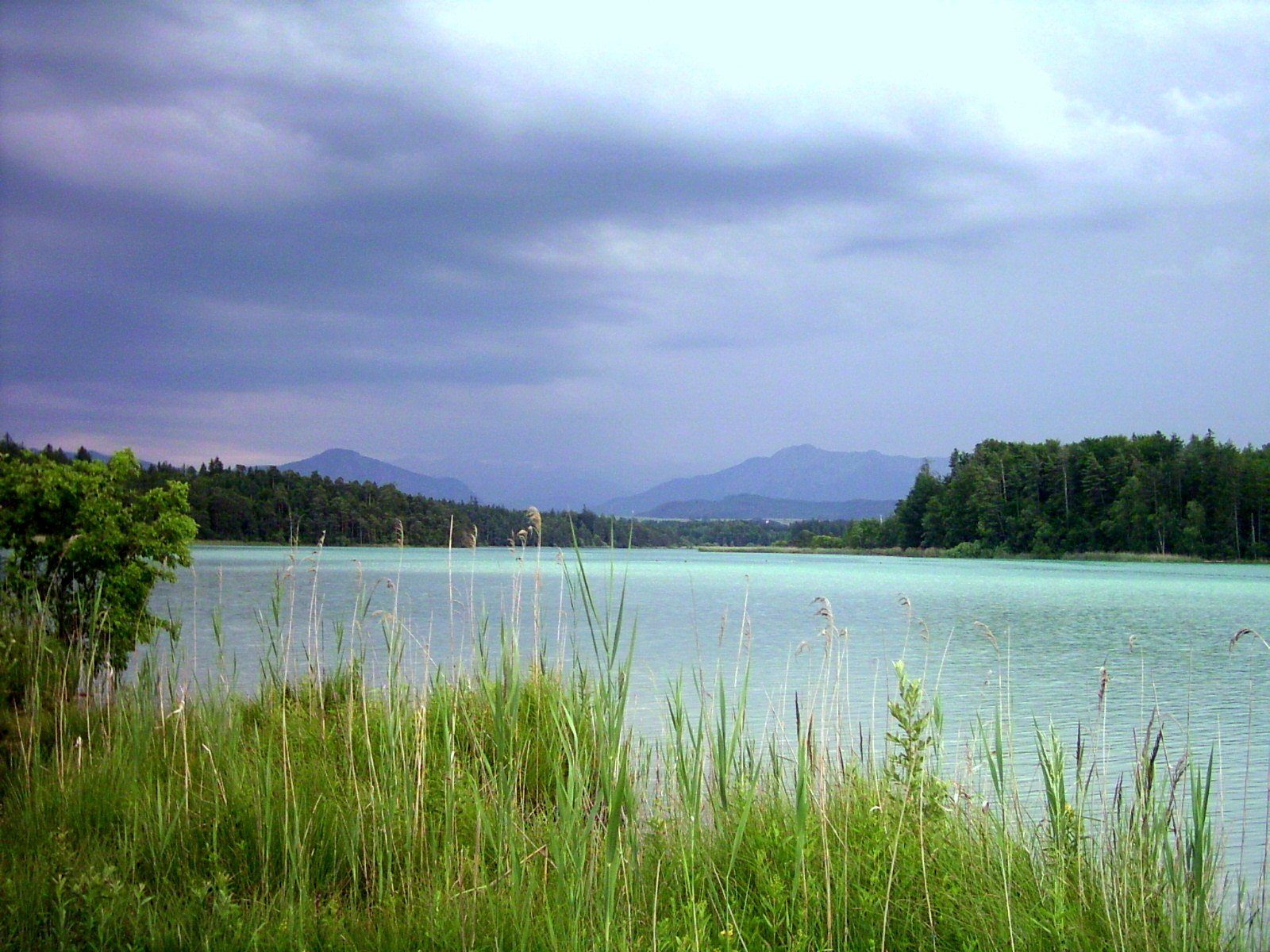
Großer Ostersee

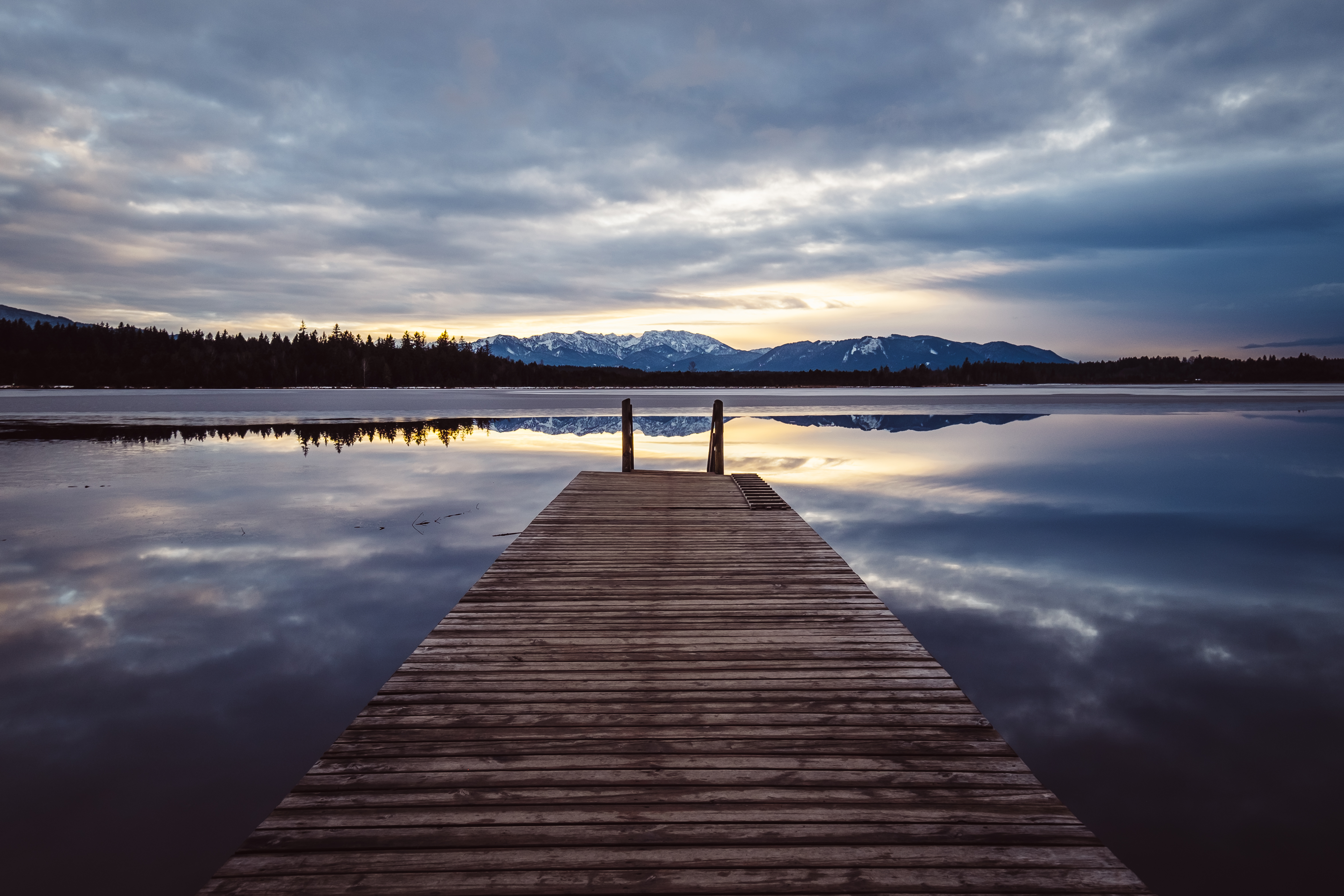
Kirchsee

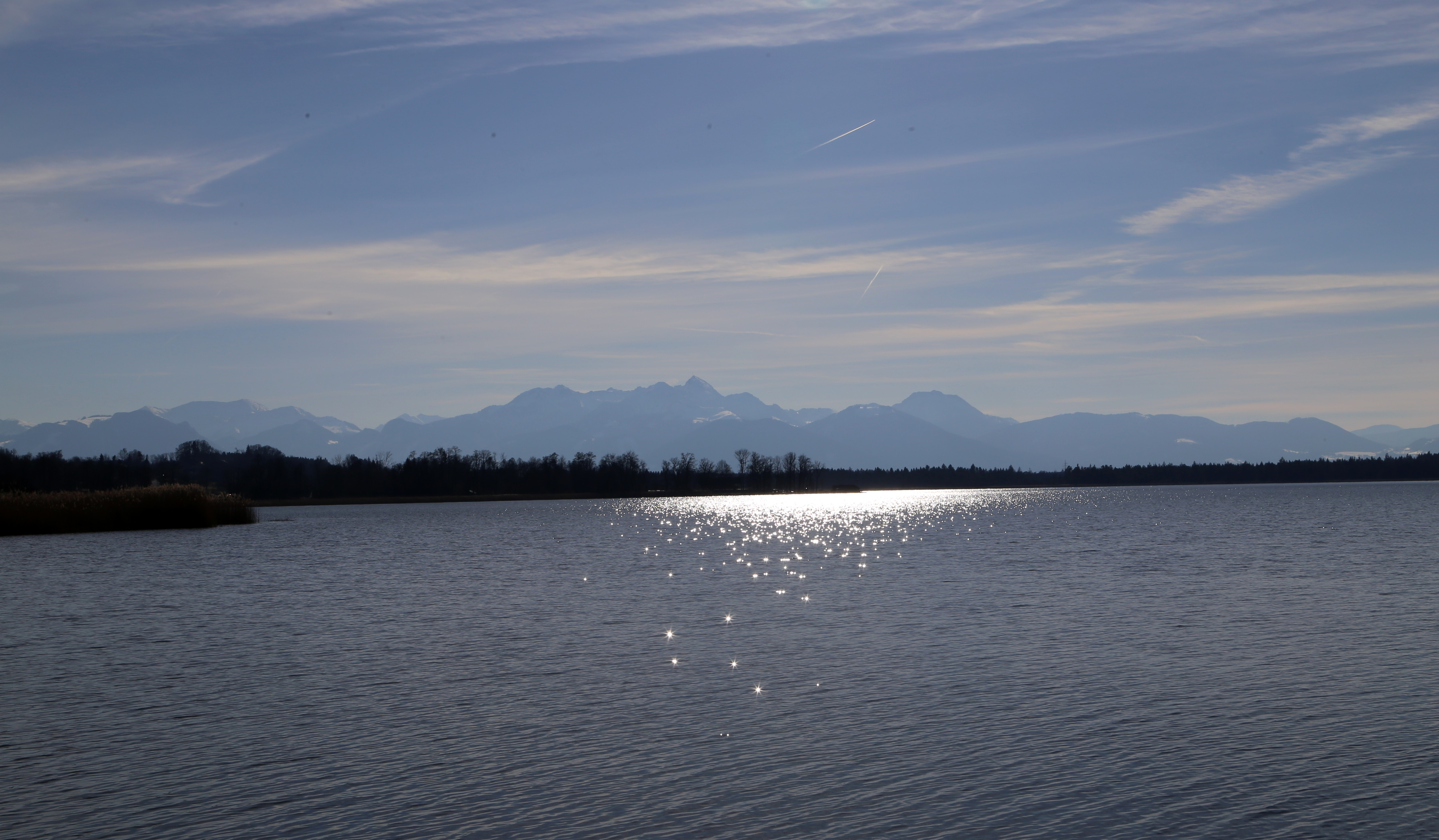
Simssee

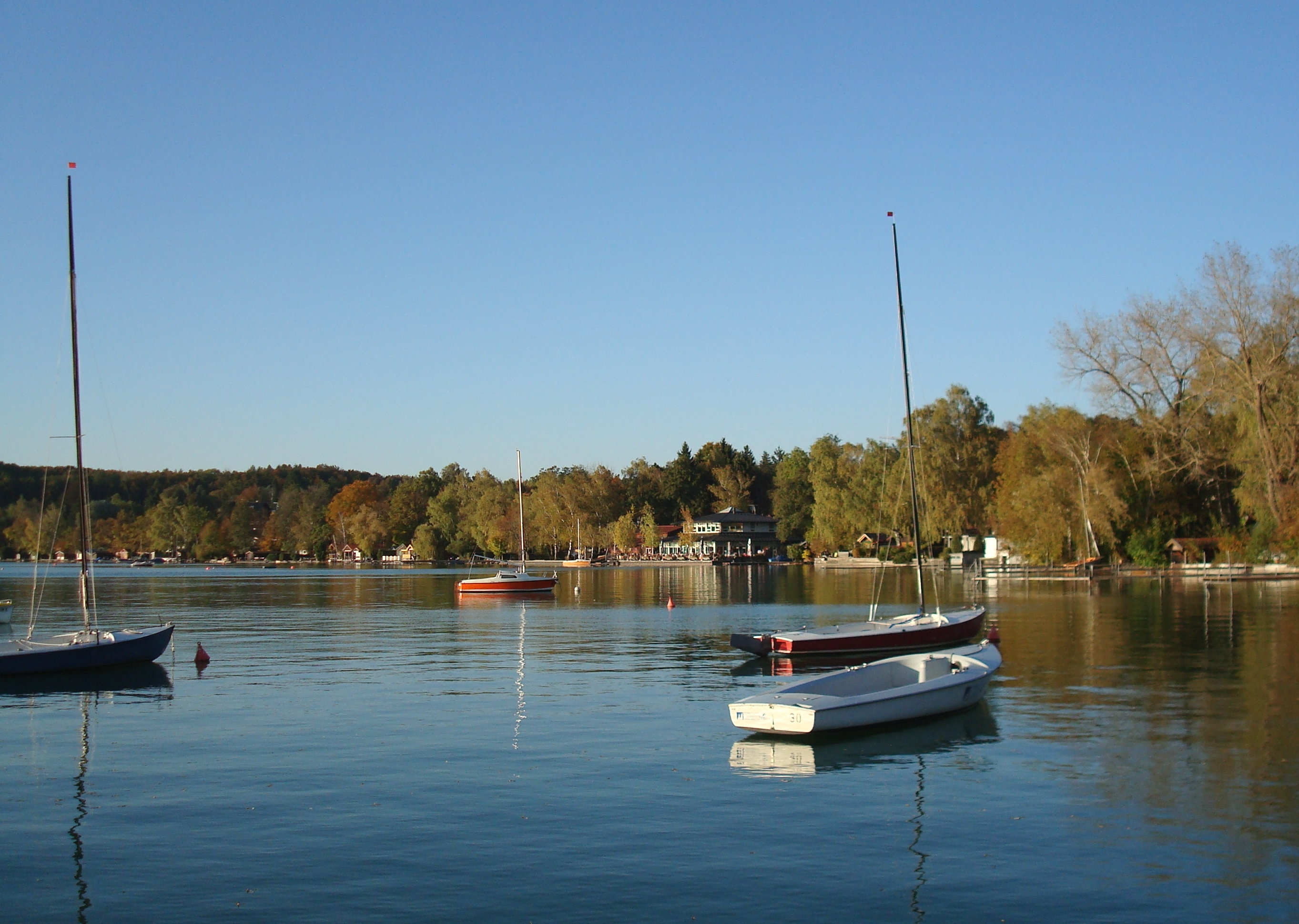
Wörthsee
