= Nockherberg =

Terrace in Munich, Germany

Coordinates: 48.1214°N 11.5825°E

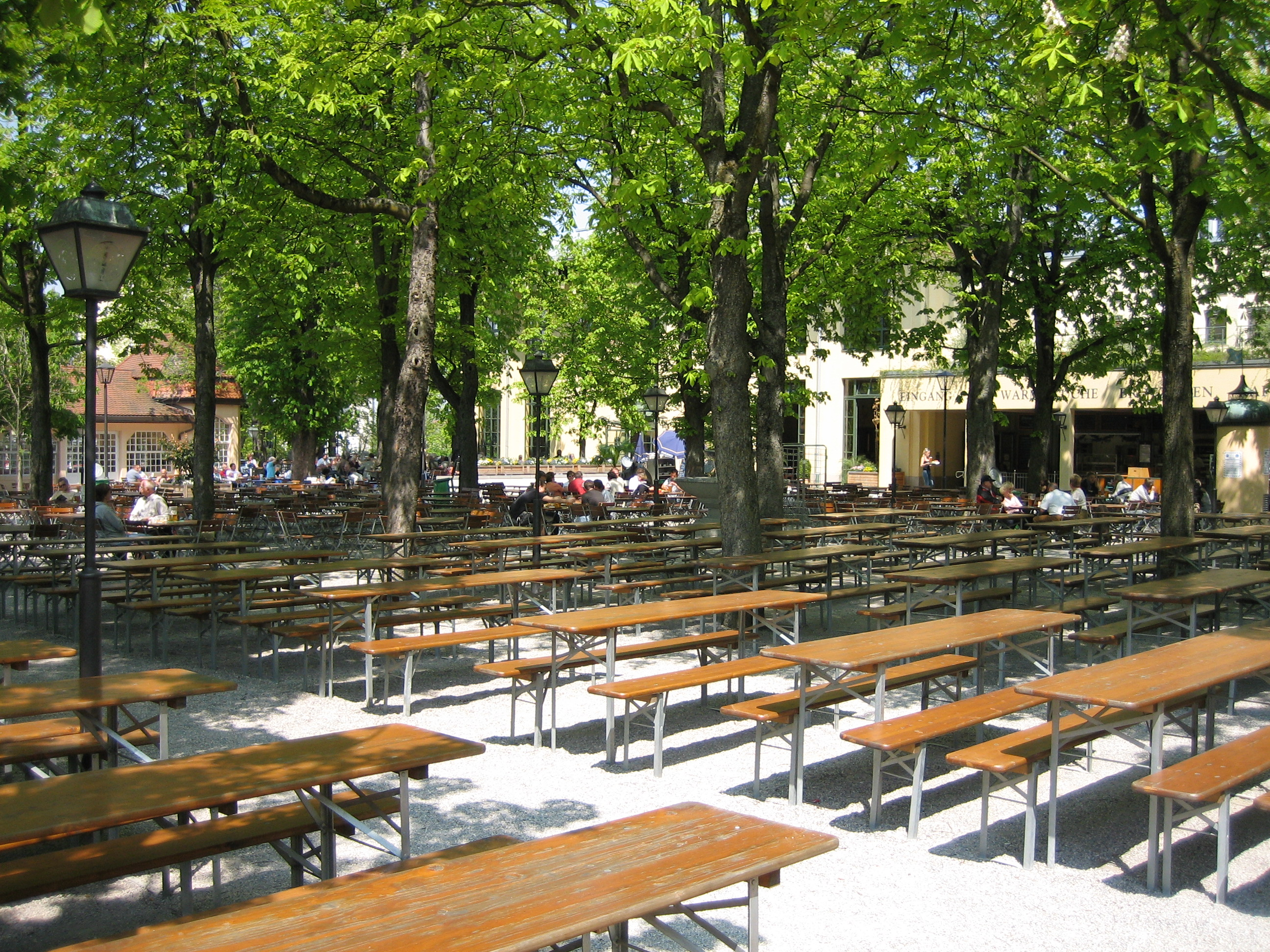
Paulaner am Nockherberg, beer garden

Nockherberg is the name of a small terrace on the slope of the eastern bank of the Isar in Munich, situated in the urban district of Au. An annual beer festival rich in tradition takes place there in the Paulaner Brewery - the Salvator-Ausschank auf dem Nockherberg The name of the raised terrace is often used synonymously for this festival or its opening event, the tapping of the first barrel of a strong, seasonal beer (Starkbieranstich).

== Origin and location ==
The name of the Nockherberg and two nearby streets can be traced back to the banking family Nockher. The family had settled in Munich in the 18th century and built a summer house on the eastern Isar heights in 1789, the so-called ‘Nockher palace’. It was located on the street known today as 'Am Nockherberg'.

The Nockherberg terrace is situated in the district of Au-Haidhausen. From the Nockherberg, (approx 535 m above sea level), the terrain descends north-west towards the Isar for approximately 20 metres. Below the hill, the street 'Am Neudeck' with the former prison Justizvollzugsanstalt Neudeck is located. To the north is the Mariahilfplatz and in a south-westerly direction the old Paulaner breweries.

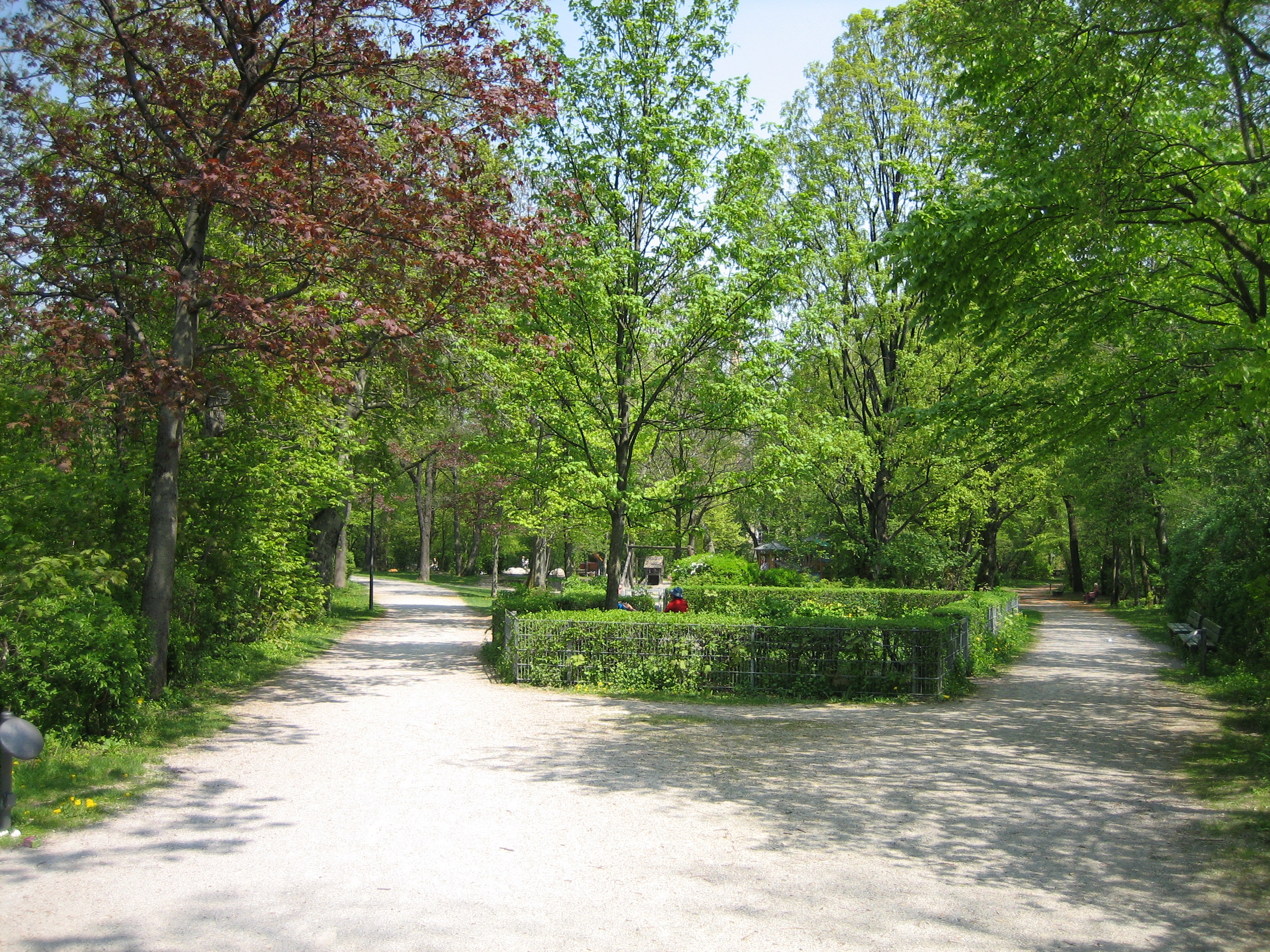
'Kronepark'

From Neudeck, the road ‘Am Nockherberg’, formerly named Ohlmüller Street, snakes up the mountainside and merges into Sankt Bonifatius Street at the top. The new brewery buildings between Reger Street in the east and Hoch Street in the west form the north-eastern part of the Nockherberg, with a rail connection to München Ost station. Hoch Street forks off Nockerberg street near the top and joins it again via the small ‘Zacherlweg’.

Across the street ‘Am Nockherberg’ from the new brewery area there is an urban park named 'Kronepark', which is situated on the south-western part of the hill and includes a playground. 'Kronepark' was built in 1958 on land owned by the former circus director Carl Krone and his widow Ida Krone, who died in 1957. Several flights of steps lead down to Nockher Street, formerly ‘Bei den Jägerhäusln’, where the road proceeds westwards below the park. A social science research centre, the Deutsches Jugendinstitut (German Youth Institute) stands here. Columbus Square is situated at the south-western end of Nocker Street.

== The strong beer festival ==
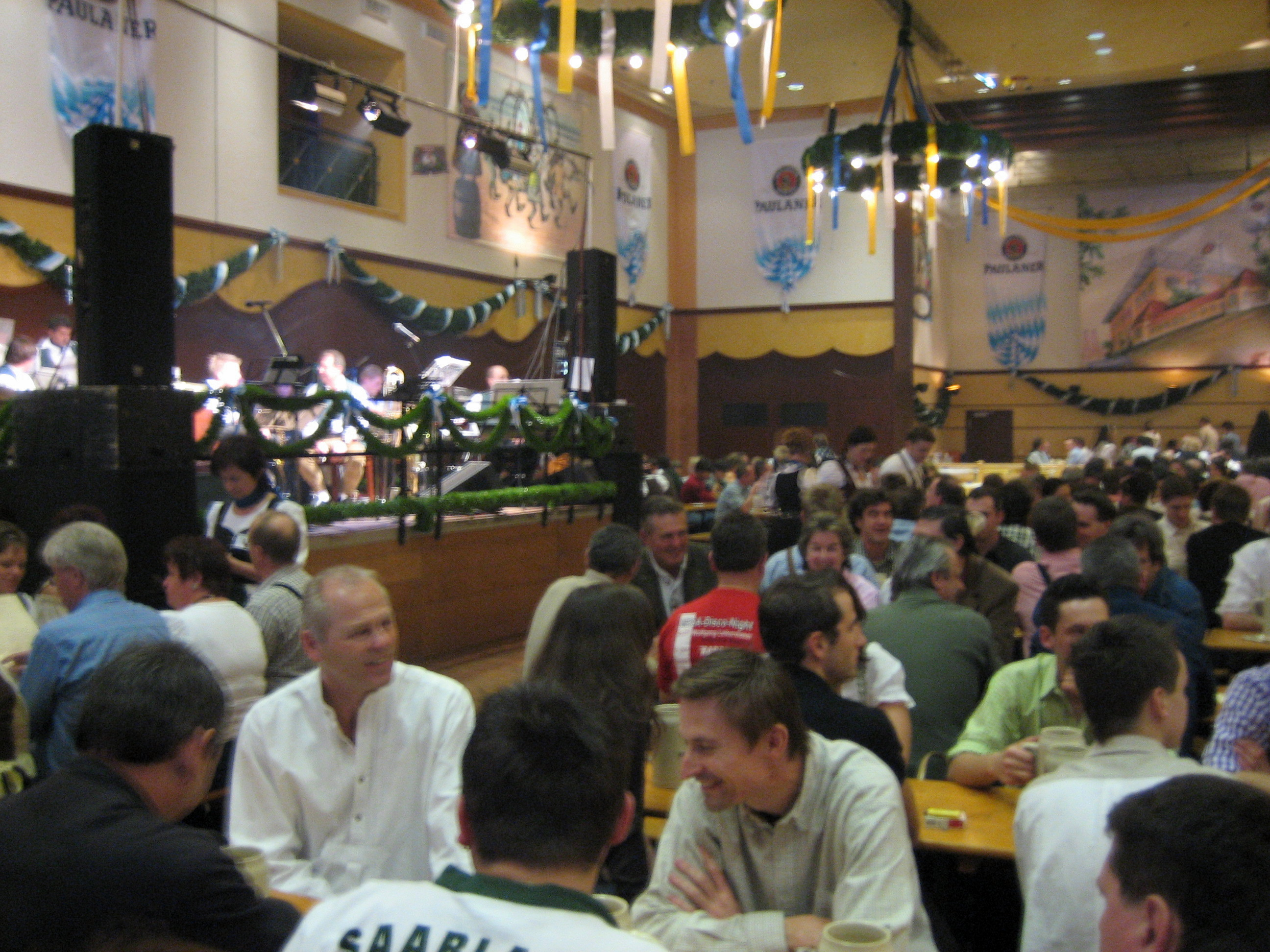
Salvator-Ausschank, 2007

The strong beer festival takes place annually during Lent in the Paulaner main hall at Hoch Street 77. It starts around Saint Joseph's Day (19 March) and lasts for 17 days. The festival is associated with the traditional ‘Holy Father Feast’ on April 2, commemorating Francis of Paola, founder of the Paulaner religious order.

With its ale-benches, light music and huge crowd of visitors, today's Salvator-Ausschank resembles the pole marquees at the Munich Oktoberfest. On the Nockherberg, beer is not served in usual beer glasses, but in Keferloher, tankards made of robust earthenware. The sturdy tankards keep the beer cool longer and also make ‘undemonstrative’ refilling possible.

=== History ===
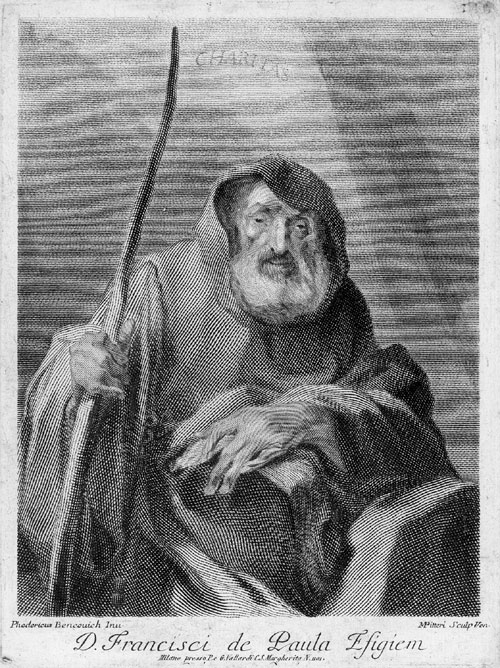
Francis of Paola

Serving strong beer at Lent can be traced back to a regulation from the religious order of the Paulaner (Minims] monastery in Neudeck ob der Au. The Paulaner monks have brewed beer in the monastery for their own consumption at least since 1634. Their nutrition was, on principle, very modest, even more so during Lent, and therefore they were permitted to brew a stronger version of their ‘liquid bread’ during this time of fasting. This strong beer, that has been brewed every year in spring since 1651, was named the ‘Holy Father Beer’ in honour of the founder of the order; later it was given the name Salvator beer. The monks later sold Salvator beer also to the public – mainly to supply the poor rural population with a nourishing drink during Lent, but also to supplement the monastery's income.

In the 18th century the Bavarian elector was habitually invited to the annual tapping of the first keg of strong beer on April 2 and he was served the first mug of beer. In a mandate dated 31 March 1751, elector Maximilian III. Joseph explicitly permitted the public serving of beer on the feast day of Francis of Paola. On 26 February 1780, Karl Theodor, elector of Bavaria since 1777, permitted the Paulaner monks to serve beer to the public year-round. The ‘Holy Father Feast’ of 1799, at which the whole court of elector Maximilian IV. Joseph participated, was the city's largest Volksfest up to that date. However, that same year the monastery of Neudeck was disbanded. The brewery located opposite the monastery was expropriated in the course of secularisation and initially sold to the Sovereign Military Order of Malta in 1803.

In 1806, master brewer Franz Xaver Zacherl (1772–1849) took a lease on the Paulaner brewery and eventually purchased it in 1813, whereby the brewery became an ordinary commercial undertaking. 'Zacherlweg' at the Nockherberg is a street named after him. Zacherl continued the tradition of annual strong-beer tapping on 2 April and the festive sale of beer (Ausschank) in the following Octave (eight days). Towards the middle of the 19th century, the first tapping shifted to March and the strong beer time was extended. In 1861, the Salvator-Ausschank started the Sunday before St. Joseph's Day and lasted for 12 days. Starting in 1858, the brewery arranged for performances by Gstanzl singers and popular folk actors (Volksschauspieler) to increase business. During the tapping in 1891, the first "Salvator speech" was held. After an interruption from 1939 to 1950 due to World War II, the strong beer festival reappeared in its present form, during which individual politicians were made fun of in clever speeches; the German term for being subjected to this kind of friendly insult is derbleckt.

==== The 'Salvator Battle' of 1888 ====
The only violent event in the history of the town festival occurred on 23 May 1888, when a trivial quarrel turned into a mass brawl between soldiers and civilians. When an artillerist drew his sabre, a fight broke out in which walking-sticks and beer mugs were also put to good use, causing a relatively large number of injuries. The fight spread throughout the hall and into the garden. Neither the gendarmes nor the jail guard from Neudeck could control the mob, so a 50-man unit of Heavy Cavalry was called, who rode into the hall swinging their sabres. When the conflict broke out there had been only one gendarmerie sergeant on duty at the Nockherberg. In a later investigation this was considered the reason for the inability to control the escalation. It was also claimed that irritation caused by an increase in the price of Salvator beer was the underlying reason for the wrath of the festival guests. The 'scandal year' 1888 remained a topic of conversation in Munich for many years.

==== Venue ====
The Salvator-Ausschank did not originally take place on the Nockherberg but in the old brewery at Neudeck, on the corner of Falken Street and Ohlmüller Street. In 1822, the Zacherlgarten inn was constructed on the grounds of the Paulaner garden to facilitate year-round drinking of Lent beer; it existed until 2008. From 1846 until 1860, beer was tapped in the so-called Neudecker Garden on a field nearby. In 1858, banker Georg Nockher sold his summer residence on the Nockherberg to the Paulaner brewery (called "Zacherlbräu" at that time), and it was turned into a beer garden. Starting in spring 1861, beer was served only here in the new Zacherl-Keller, renamed the Salvator-Keller in 1928. The inn Zum Nockhergarten, the former Nockher palace (Nockherschlösschen), was razed in 1903/1904.

During World War II the brewery gallery with its massive arches was used as the command post of Munich's air-raid defence headquarters. Part of the building was also made available to the public as a shelter. The cellar was completely destroyed during a bombing raid on 24 April 1944. The new Salvator-Keller, designed by professor Franz Zell, reopened on 11 March 1950.

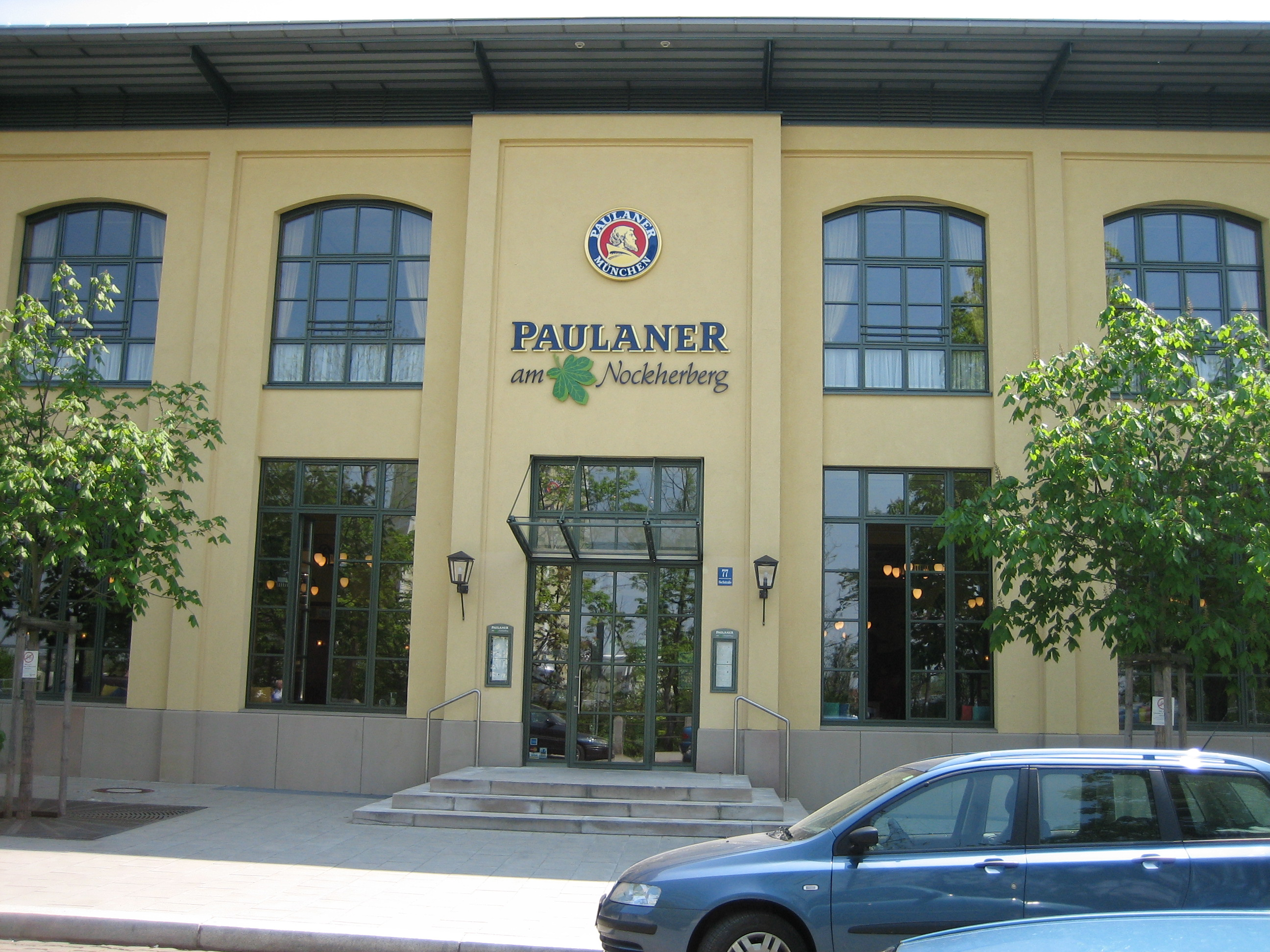
Paulaner am Nockherberg, 2006

On 28 August 1965, the extreme right-wing NPD held its first federal party conference in the Salvator-Keller. In the night of 27 to 28 November 1999, the cellar, now called Paulaner-Keller, was almost entirely destroyed by arson. Firefighting operations with 89 fire engines lasted for two days. The resulting damage amounted to approximately 15 million euros. In spite of intensive efforts, the offender has so far not been identified amongst 650 suspects. In March 2004, 39-year-old Karl R., known as the "step-brother" of Nockherberg publican Peter Pongratz and relative of the Fischer-Vroni family, was remanded in custody as a suspect in the crime. However, he was released after a few months for lack of evidence.

In the years 2000 to 2002, the Salvator-Ausschank took place in a specially-built tent on the Mariahilfplatz below the Nockherberg. The Paulaner-Keller was torn down in 2001 and in 2003 replaced by a newly constructed above-ground Paulaner festive hall, which offers room for up to 2500 customers. The reconstruction cost around 25 million euros. One of the rooms in the vaulted cellar of the new inn Paulaner am Nockherberg is now once again called the Salvatorkeller. The fountain, famous from television advertising, is located in the beer garden, which has again been accessible since 2003.

=== Political kick-off: sampling the strong beer ===
The kick-off event of the annual Salvator-Ausschank is the tasting of the first strong beer of the "fifth season", attended by many regional and federal Bavarian politicians. Due to Bavarian Television broadcasts since 1982, the tapping of the strong beer keg on the Nockherberg and the subsequent program can be viewed by a wide audience. The television broadcast in 2004 had approximately 2.8 million viewers. In 2015, the live-broadcast was followed by 2.8 million viewers Germany-wide, of which 2.05 million were Bavarian viewers.

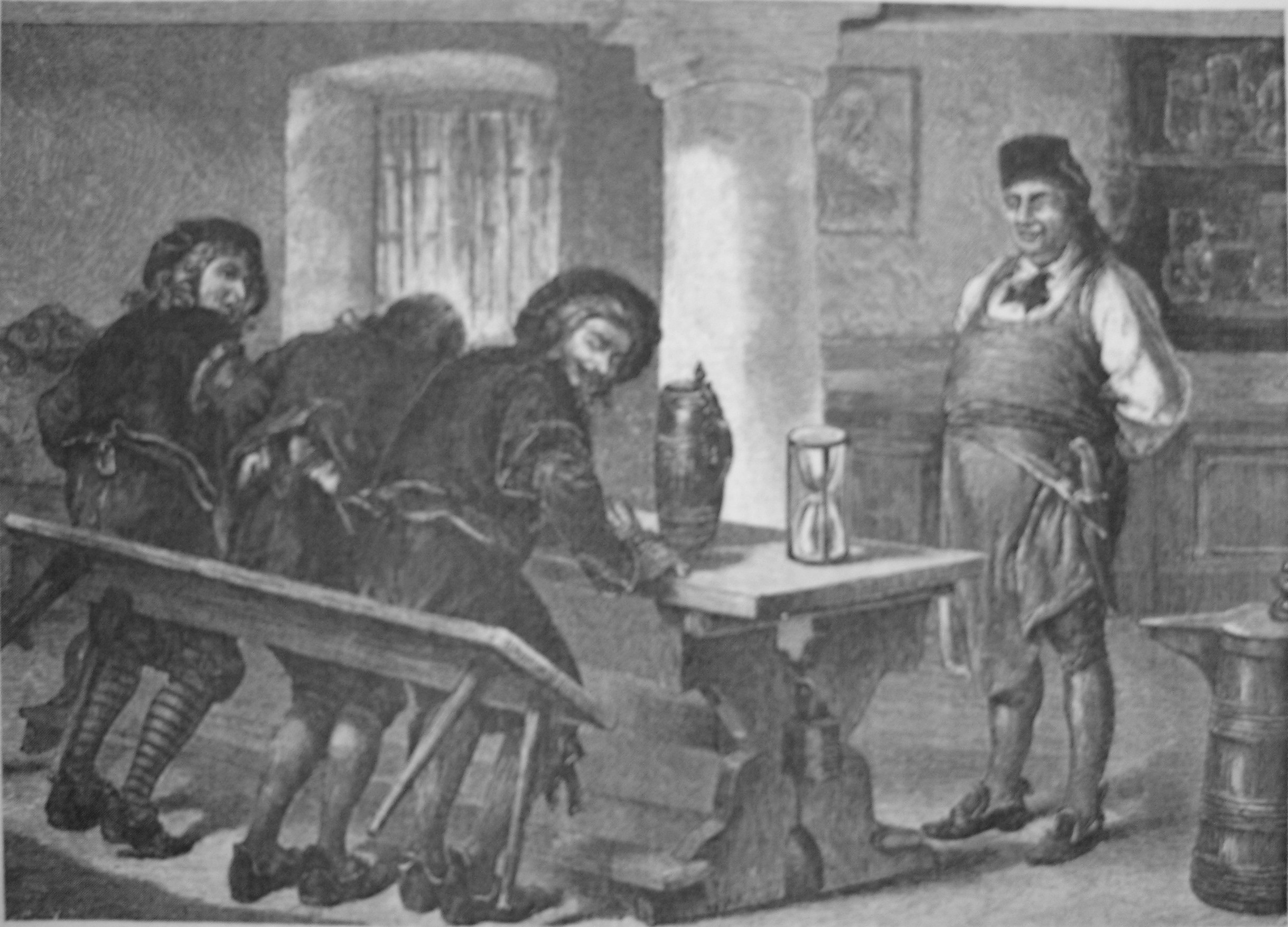
Historic beer tasting

The event begins with an actual beer tasting. The first Maß, which was originally presented to the prince-elector, has been handed to the Bavarian minister-president since 1965. The head of the brewery passes him the mug with the traditional words: Salve pater patriae! Bibas, princeps optime! (lat. "Be welcome, father of the fatherland! Drink, best prince!"). However, the present "father of the nation" is not expected to carry out the traditional Salvator test, which would not function anyway because the recipe has been modified; originally, Lenten beer was considered to be strong enough only if a bench drenched with the beer would adhere to a person's Lederhosen when he attempted to stand up.

The highlight of the event is the Derblecken of politicians, a political cabaret in front of invited guests, consisting of a speech followed by a Singspiel. In both contributions current Munich issues as well as sharp commentaries on regional and federal politics are presented in cleverly worded ironic statements and more or less heavy sideswipes aimed at politicians of all parties. For a Bavarian politician, not being "derbleckt", meaning not being taken for a ride in the festive contributions, can almost be interpreted as a sign of one's irrelevance or lack of a distinctive personality.

It's true, Mr. Rothemund, that you know 70 percent of the electorate, that's why it was the other 30 percent who voted for you. (Hannes Burger derbleckt the Bavarian chairman of the SPD, Helmut Rothemund in the 1983 Nockerberg Lent "sermon")

In 1991, the Nockerberg beer festival was cancelled due to the Gulf War, and in 2003 due to the Iraq War. In 2009 the event was scheduled for 12 March but postponed to the end of the Salvator-Ausschank period on 2 April because of the Winnenden school shooting.

==== Tradition of Derblecken ====
Derblecken (Bavarian for 'making fun of someone') can be traced back to the tradition of an innkeeper greeting his guests. In former times he was apt to know all the villagers by name and was quite familiar with all the local stories and rumours. Regular guests were frequently teased with those stories by humorous and self-confident innkeepers. For events where the guests were to be welcomed in a similar way, rhetorically less talented innkeepers or hosts ordered professional Hochzeitsbitter or Gstanzl singers who informed themselves about the guests' peculiarities and sensitivities beforehand. The victims of mockery were expected to take it with good grace, since any offense taken would give rise to even greater public amusement.

This tradition is still cultivated today. Since the 'victims' are invited guests, overly rude or insulting criticism, which would reflect on the host (or the brewery itself) is prohibited. Consequently, the authors of the festive contributions strive to put forth particularly critical 'attacks' indirectly, with clever wording, or with a wink.

==== Commemorative speech ====
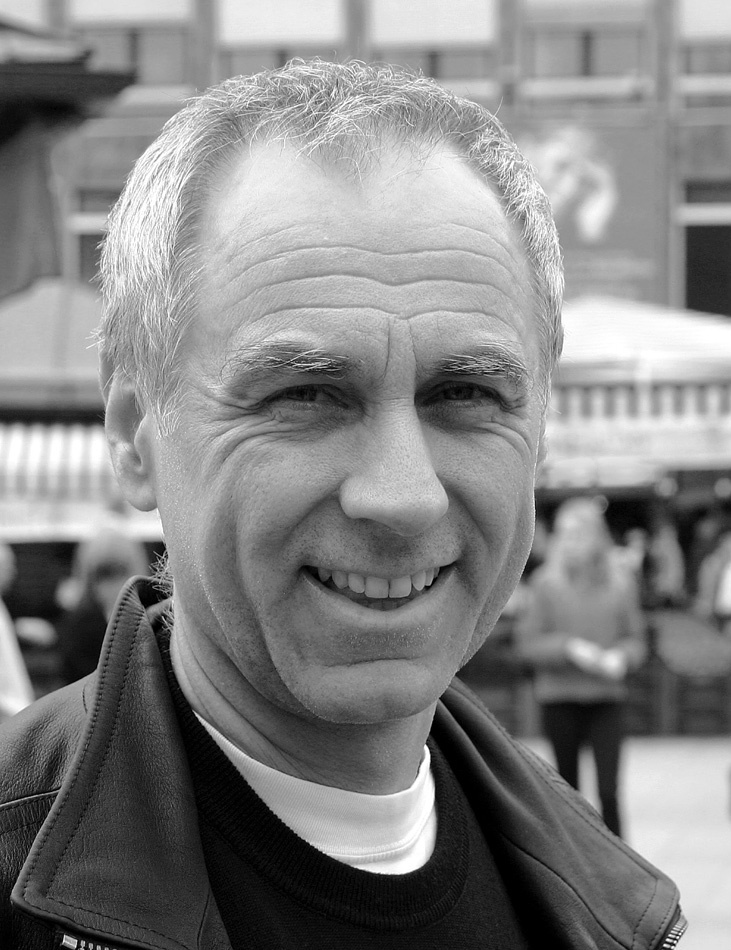
Bruno Jonas, speaker 2004–2006

The first Salvator speaker was humourist Jakob Geist in 1891. In 1922 he was followed by actor Weiß Ferdl, master of ceremonies Adolf Gondrell, Gstanzl singer Roider Jackl and radio host Emil Vierlinger, who organised the radio broadcasting of the Derblecken on the Nockherberg after World War II. After his serious illness in the 1970s, Michl Lang, Klaus Havenstein, Franz Schönhuber, Ernst Maria Lang, and finally the actor and Paulaner spokesperson Walter Sedlmayr (1982–1990) took over.

From 1992 to 2010 the speakers (with the exception of 2007) performed the role of the monk Bruder Barnabas, who holds a Lenten "sermon" for the guests. The role can be traced back to the Paulaner monk Friar Barnabas (1750–1795), whose original name was Valentin Stephan Still. He became a master brewer in Munich in 1774 and is said to have invented the basic recipe for the modern Salvator strong beer.

The first Salvator speaker who performed in the historical role of Brother Barnabas was Max Grießer (1992–1996), followed by Erich Hallhuber (1997–1998). Hallhuber insisted on being permitted to change the text of speechwriter Hannes Burger, while Burger himself insisted on a verbatim performance of his text. Due to this argument Hallhuber cancelled his performance at short notice in 1999. His successor Gerd Fischer (1999–2003) presented his sermons in a tone that benevolently pitied those he derbleckt. With the cabaret artist Bruno Jonas (2004–2006) the Lenten sermons again became more sharp-tongued. In 2007, the Lower Bavarian cabaret artist Django Asül gave the Salvator speech without a cowl. From 2008 to 2010, the former Edmund Stoiber-double Michael Lerchenberg gave the Lenten sermon again in the role of Brother Barnabas.

The author Hannes Burger wrote the "commemorative" Derblecken speeches for 22 years, from 1982 until 2003. Since 2004 the speakers have written their own texts. In the years 2008 to 2010, cabaret artist Christian Springer was co-author of the Lenten sermons. He resigned as Derblecker, as did speaker Michael Lechrenberg, after some public figures, including Guido Westerwelle, Christine Haderthauer, and Charlotte Knobloch were offended by the content of their sermons.

Since 2011 Luise Kinseher has given the Salvator speech (status: 2016). She is the first female to do so. She performs in the role of Mama Bavaria, whom she personified during the Singspiel in 2010.

==== Singspiel ====
One of the main authors of the Salvatorspiel was Holger Paetz from 1999 to 2009, who also portrayed FDP politician Guido Westerwelle. After the singspiel the attendant politicians were photographed by the cameras of the journalists and television stations together with the actors who parodied them. The singspiel has been show-managed by Marcus H. Rosenmüller since 2013.

=== Artistic appreciation ===
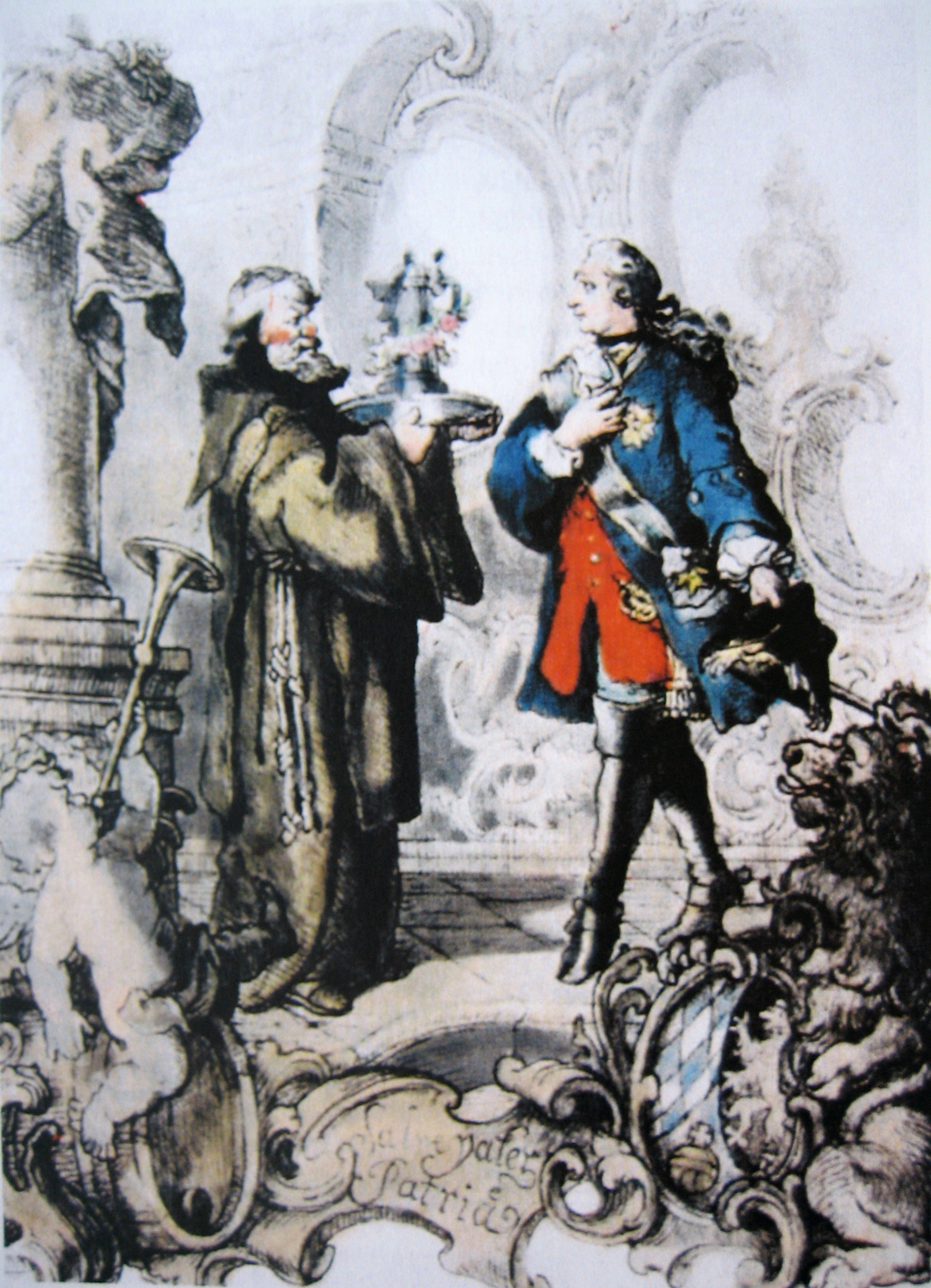
Frater Barnabas offers Salvator beer to Elector Karl Theodor, painting by Eduard Ille

The traditional Salvator festival inspired numerous artists in Munich. Poems and drawings with the strong beer and the serving of this on the Nockherberg as a motif abounded, many of which can be found in the brewery's guestbook, or were published in Munich magazines, including input from well-known authors such as Karl Valentin and Paul Heyse. The operetta Salvator (music by Theo Rupprecht, text by Max Ferner, Philipp Wichand and Michail Alexandrowitsch Weikone) premiered in Munich in 1911 featuring Father Barnabas as a central character, and served as the model for the 1952 film Monks, Girls and Hungarian Soldiers.

Eduard Ille (1823–1900), painter, illustrator, caricaturist, and author from Munich become a Salvator poet. In many contributions to the humorous magazine Fliegende Blätter he glamourized Salvator beer and its 'founder' Father Barnabas. In the following poem he describes the electoral beer tasting, which took place in March. It can almost be considered a hymn to Lenten beer.

When in March nigh Passion Sunday / springtime once again was near,
rode – to honour an old custom – / he himself, our Lord Elector
up to Neudeck ob der Au, / Paulaner brewery was his goal.
There our sovereign Lord was greeted / by Barnabas, the brewery monk,
who with delight and full of joy / offered him a mug of beer
with a greeting that evermore / a common saying did remain:
"Salve, pater patriae! / Bibas, princeps optime!"

== Other aspects of the site ==
The high terrain at the Nockherberg, which was formed almost 10,000 years ago, provided not only a safe location and storage place for the population of Au but also a supply of water and energy which they used in creative ways, not only for breweries.

=== Formation and geology ===
In the Tertiary, a sea periodically extended from the foot of the Alps to the highlands of the Bavarian Forest. This sea was filled increasingly with weathering material from the Alps. The finest and youngest deposition layer of the Tertiary (upper fresh water molasse of the Miocene), the Flinz, now forms a water runoff, known as a soil horizon, which retains groundwater. For this reason springs emerge from the hillsides in the Isartal at several places in Munich, as can be observed at Spring Street, beneath the northern Hoch Street. These springs played an important role in the drinking water supply of the local population at least until the beginning of the 20th century.

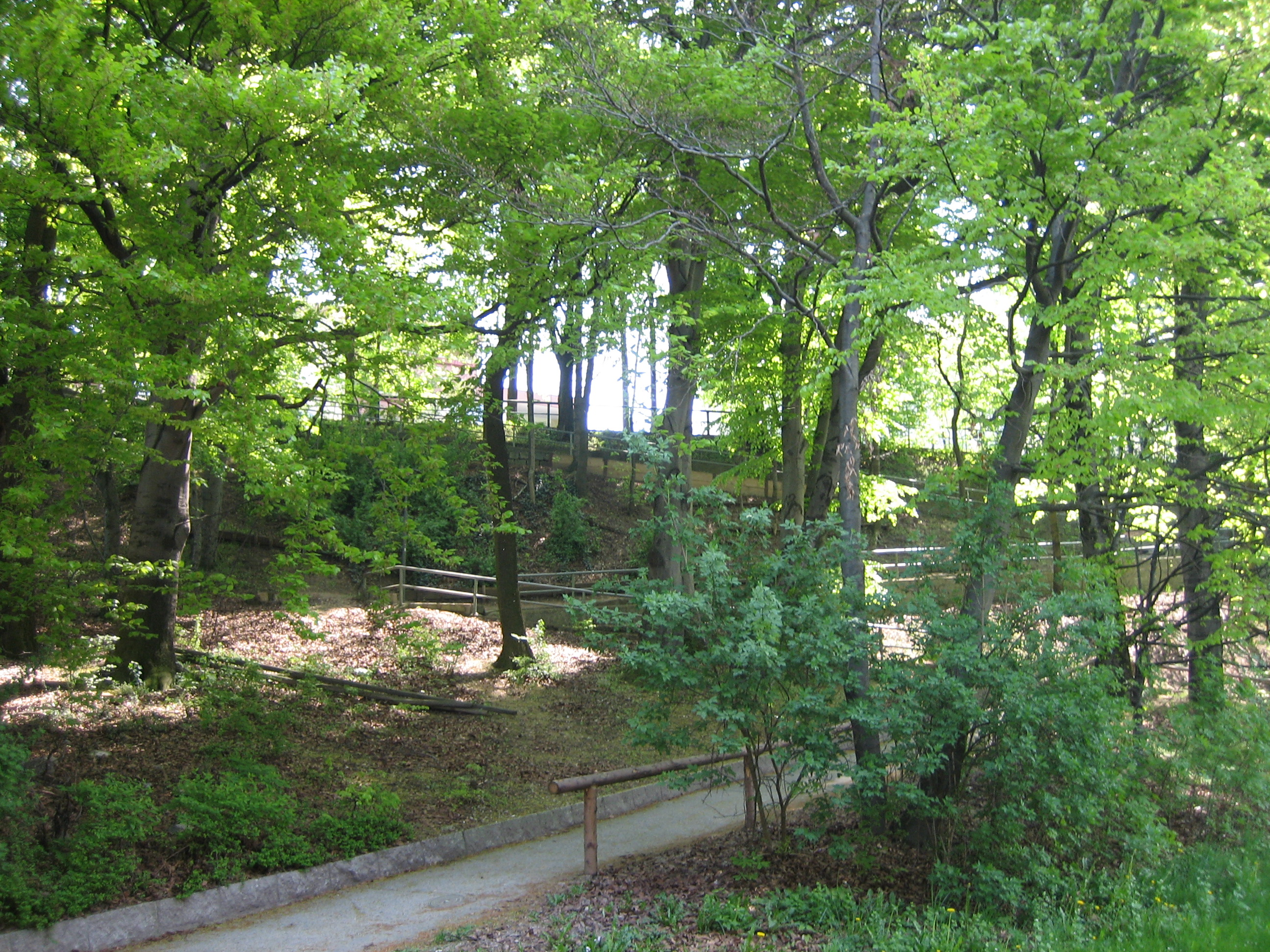
From Kolumbusplatz via 'Am Bergsteig' to the Nockherberg

During the ice ages of the Quaternary, glaciers and meltwater covered the Flinz with rough erosion- and weathering material from the Alps, which formed the Munich gravel plain. Since further erosion occurred, only the last two gravel layers remained in the Giesinger region. The Giesinger gravel area formed terraces, along with the neighbouring Harlachinger gravel area four to ten metres higher. Towards the end of the last ice age, approximately 10,000 years ago, the Isar dug its present valley, known as the Au, out of these terraces. Thus, beside the sloping edge along Nockherberg and Hoch street, further uplands in this area, for example the Drum mountain with the ramp of Candid Street, 'Am Bergsteig' and the Giesinger mountain, emerged as well. Since the steep street gradients of over 12% constructed there proved to be a significant traffic obstruction, several elaborate slope modifications were undertaken between 1890 and 1935. At the Nockherberg, the re-design took place in the years 1904/1905, whereby the former Nocker palace was demolished. Likewise, since 1904, the Nockherberg stairway connects Hoch Street in front of the Paulaner brewery with Ohlmüller Street at the foot of the Nockherberg.

=== Use ===
Between approximately 1150 and 1301, the lords of Giesing were said to have had a manorhouse at the Nockherberg near today's Ruhe Street. Ownership of the estate at the Nockherberg can be traced from the 15th century up to the time of its sale to the Nockher family on 13 July 1789.

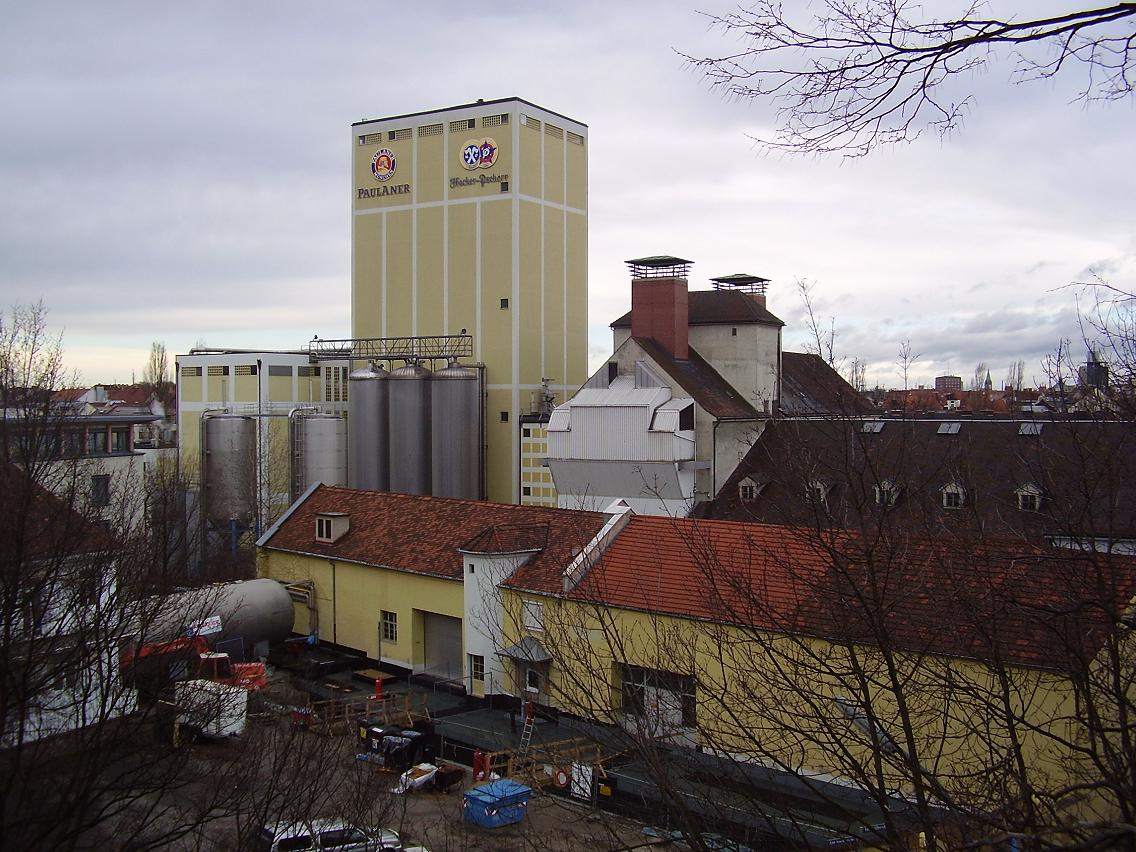
Former breweries at the foot of the Nockherberg

The edge of the terrace on and nearby 'Berg' formerly provided ideal conditions for many breweries to construct storage cellars and deep-water wells. From the early 19th century onwards, nearly all of the city's 60 breweries had built summer beer cellars on the Isar hillside in the Au, as well as in Haidhausen. The transition from being only a storage and sales operation to a summertime beer-serving inn is generally perceived as the beginning of the Bavarian beer garden tradition. The Paulander brewery transported the water needed for brewing from their own 10-metre-deep wells. The tunnel used still exists and can be viewed in the course of a tour through the brewery.

Today, water for brewing is provided by wells which have a depth of 210–240 m.

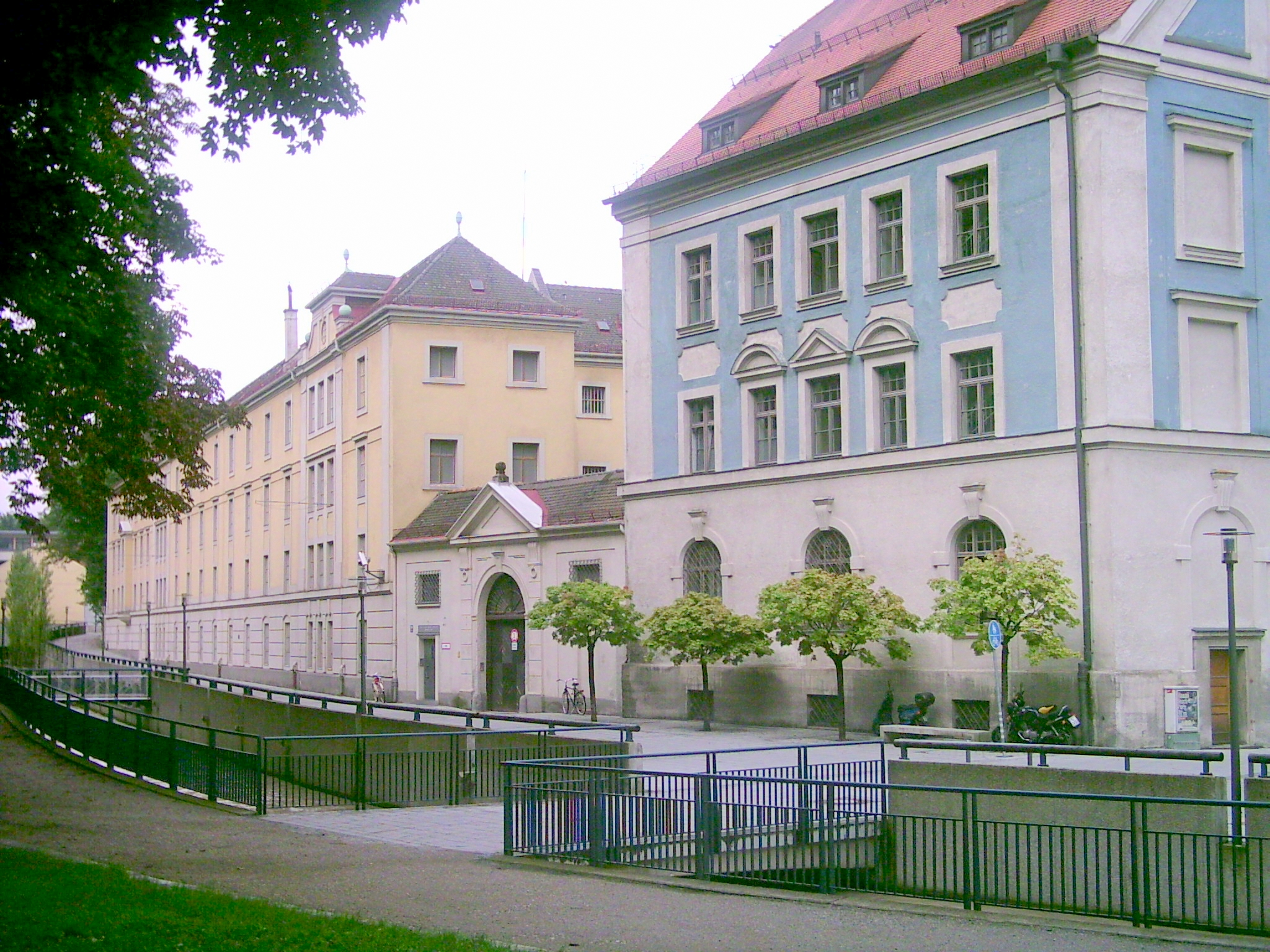
Auer Mühlbach at Neudeck

The Auer Mühlbach, a tributary of the Isar, runs between Nockherberg and Neudeuck and has appeared above ground at this location only since 2002. The formerly wild stream has played a significant role in providing energy since the Middle Ages,. In 1816 it drove a total of 60 water wheels in the Au. From 1881, this urban stream was used to power the chiller invented by Carl von Linde. This ice machine made it possible for the Paulander brewery to brew beer year-round, and it can still be viewed today.

== Literature ==
- Hannes Burger: 350 Jahre Paulaner-Salvator-Thomasbräu AG. 1634–1984. Jubiläums-Festschrift. Paulaner-Salvator-Thomasbräu AG, München 1984
- ders.: Politiker derblecken beim Salvator. Hinter den Kulissen vom Nockherberg. 2. Auflage, Rosenheimer Verlagshaus, Rosenheim 1998, ISBN 3-475-52911-4.
- Gerd Holzheimer: Der Münchner Nockherberg. In: Charivari. 21. März 1995, Bergemann & Mayer, S. 14–17, ISSN 0343-2548.
- Helmut Lindner (Hrsg.): Giesing, Au, Haidhausen. Alte Dörfer rechts der Isar vor den Toren Münchens. Seit 125 Jahren bei München. Aumeier, München 1979 (especially the essays referred to in the footnotes)
- Peter Klimesch: Drunt in der grünen Au. Die Nockherstraße im Wandel der Zeit. (Darin ein Kapitel über den Nockherberg) Norderstedt 2014, ISBN 978-3-7357-4929-1.
- Peter Klimesch: Bilder aus der alten Au. Books on Demand 2015, ISBN 978-3-7392-0605-9.
