= Nockherstraße =

Street in Munich, Germany

Coordinates: 48°7′13.01″N 11°34′47.49″E

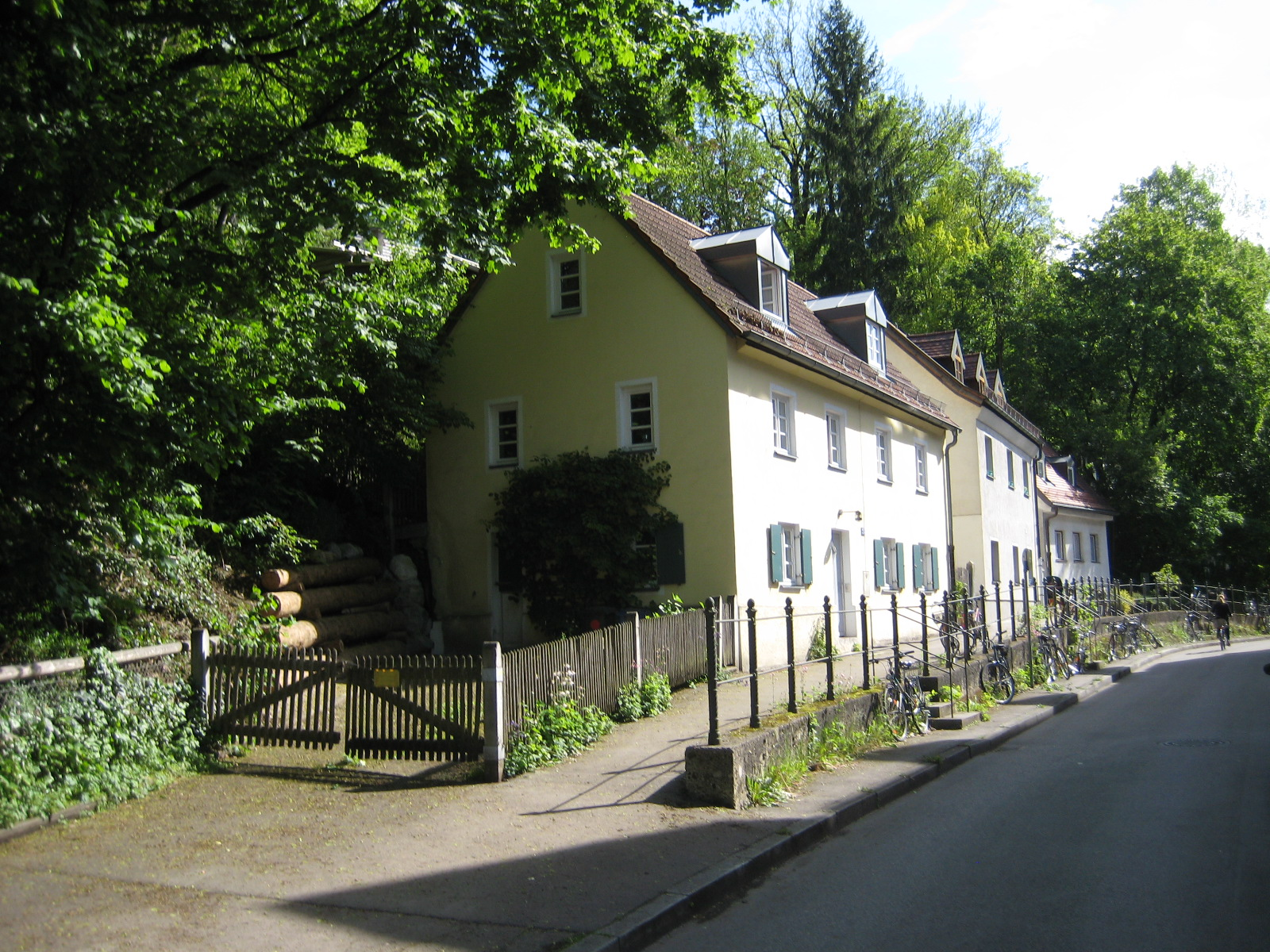
Nockherstraße 25–29

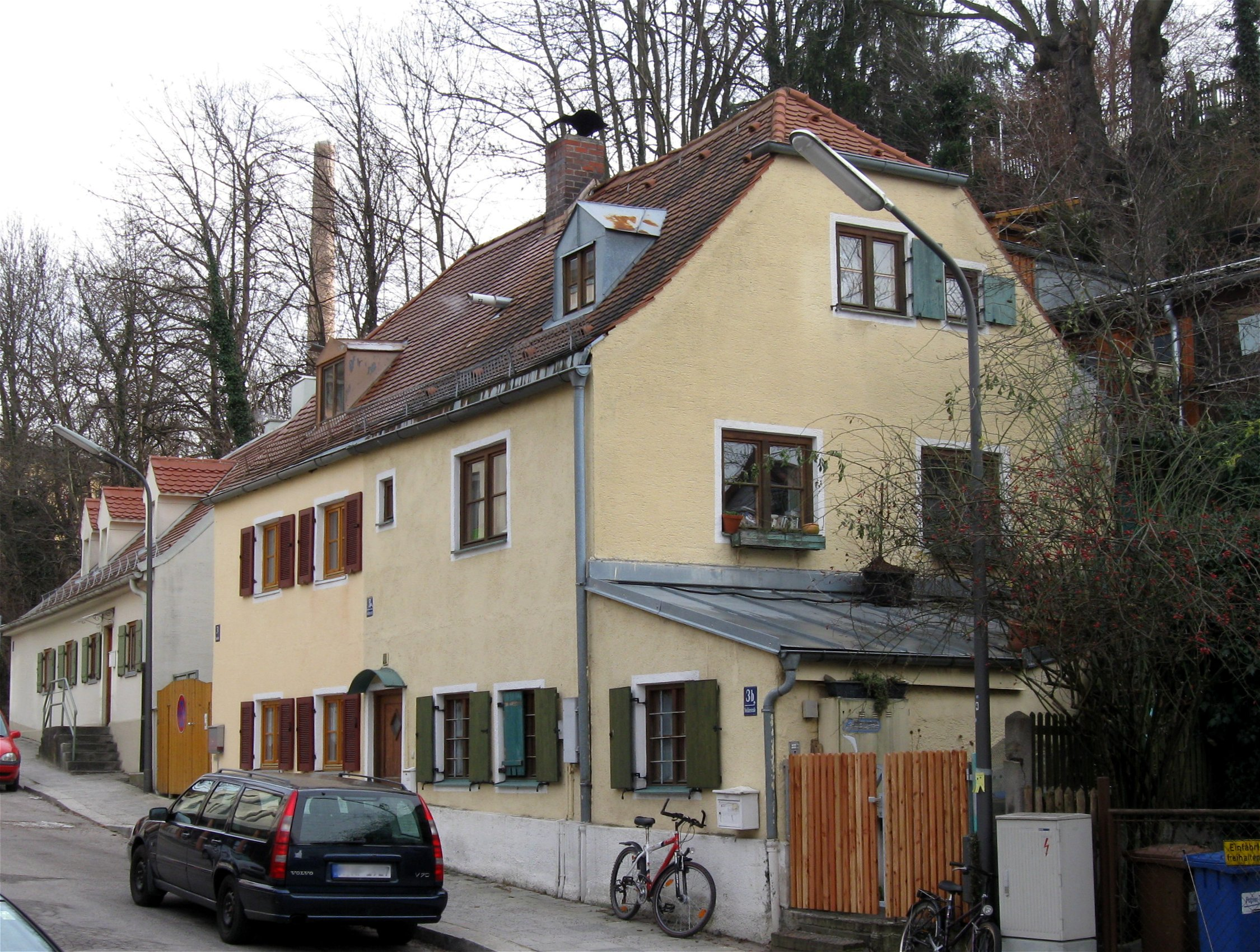
Nockherstraße 3

The Nockherstraße is a road located in the south of Au-Haidhausen, the 5th district of Munich, Germany. The former suburb of Au is located in the original flooding area of the Isar. The 500-meter-long road runs between the end of the Ohlmüllerstraße (beginning of the street Am Nockherberg) and the Kolumbusplatz at the foot of the Isar river terrace. About 400 people live in Nockherstraße.

== History ==
The middlepoint of the road was two mills on the Auer Mühlbach (15th century) and buildings for hunters from the electoral Falkenhof with the tavern Zum Jägerwirt. The original name of the street was Jägerhäuselgasse or Bei den Jägerhäuseln, as noted in the official register of house numbering for the Au suburb of 1857. In 1876, the street was renamed after the socially committed Nockher banking family to Nockherstraße. Their castle stood on the present Nockherberg.

Beginning of the 19th century (recorded from 1813 and seen on plans of various house records), a dense development with so-called hostel houses was built on the slope side. In the northern part of the street, the hop fishery settled in with five fish ponds. Agriculture was on the decline in the middle of the 19th century. In addition to the agricultural areas, ponds and cattle stables, production facilities began to establish, first with one of the largest bedspring factories in southern Germany and after the Second World War, a branch of Rohde & Schwarz. The transition from agriculture to craft and industry took place at the same time as the incorporation of the town of Au into the city of Munich (1854).

From around 1860, the opposite western side of the street was gradually built with rental housing. In addition, there were four taverns and a sauerkraut factory. Directly adjacent to the industrial district, dairy farming and pig breeding were continued until well into the 20th century. Until the year 1979, a poultry farm and a fish shop existed.

During the Second World War, a large part of the houses was destroyed and not rebuilt on the slope side in favor of a planned green corridor. Today, only a few of the now, modern equipped, hostel houses exist as a reminder of the times. The rental housing on the side facing away from the slope were rebuilt in the style of the respective period from the 1960s and are gradually being converted into condominiums.

== Earlier operations ==
- House number 2-4: Hoffischerei (Fishery) from the middle of the 16th century to the 19th century - then Bettfedernfabrik (Bed Spring Factory) Billigheimer and Einstein, 1934 aryanized. After the war: Metal press factory of Rohde & Schwarz, then until 1992 the headquarters of Kaut-Bullinger. Today an office complex, among other things, with the Deutsches Jugendinstitut (German Youth Institute) as a tenant.
- Number 7: Farm
- Number 26: Historic Tavern Zum Jägerwirt
- Number 40: Sauerkraut factory Braun & Wagner

== Current operations ==
- Number 38: Hotel am Nockherberg
- Number 48 (later: 50): Kunstschmiede Nüssel

== Road access ==
- U1, U2 and U7 (Kolumbusplatz station)
- Bus 52 (stop Taubenstraße)
- Bus 58 (stop Kolumbusplatz)
