= Vespermann =

Vespermann is a surname. Notable people with the surname include:

- Clara Vespermann (1799–1827), German operatic soprano
- Gerd Vespermann (1926–2000), German actor, son of Kurt Vespermann
- Maria Vespermann (1823–1882), German composer, writer and painter
- Kurt Vespermann (1887–1957), German actor
