= Wittelsbacherbrücke =

Bridge in Munich, Germany

Wittelsbach Bridge Wittelsbacherbrücke
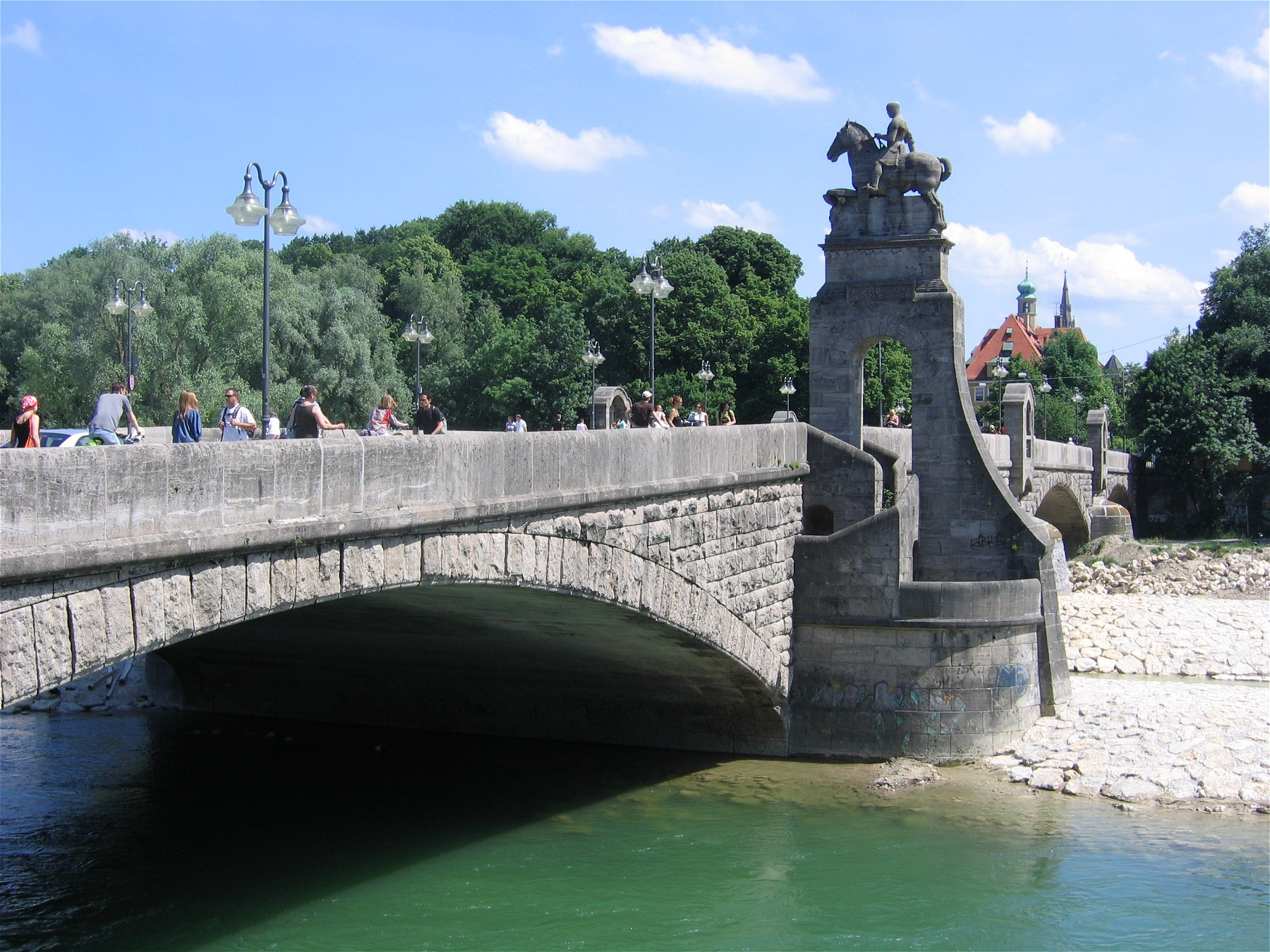
- Coordinates: 48.12270°N 11.56772°E
- Crosses: Isar River

Characteristics
- Total length: 140m

History
- Architect: Theodor Fischer
- Engineering design by: Saget & Woerner
- Opened: 1874
- Rebuilt: 1904

Location
- Interactive map of Wittelsbach Bridge

Wittelsbacherbrücke is an arched bridge in Munich, Germany, crossing the river Isar and connecting the districts of Isarvorstadt and Au. It is famous for its equestrian statue of Duke Otto I.

== History ==
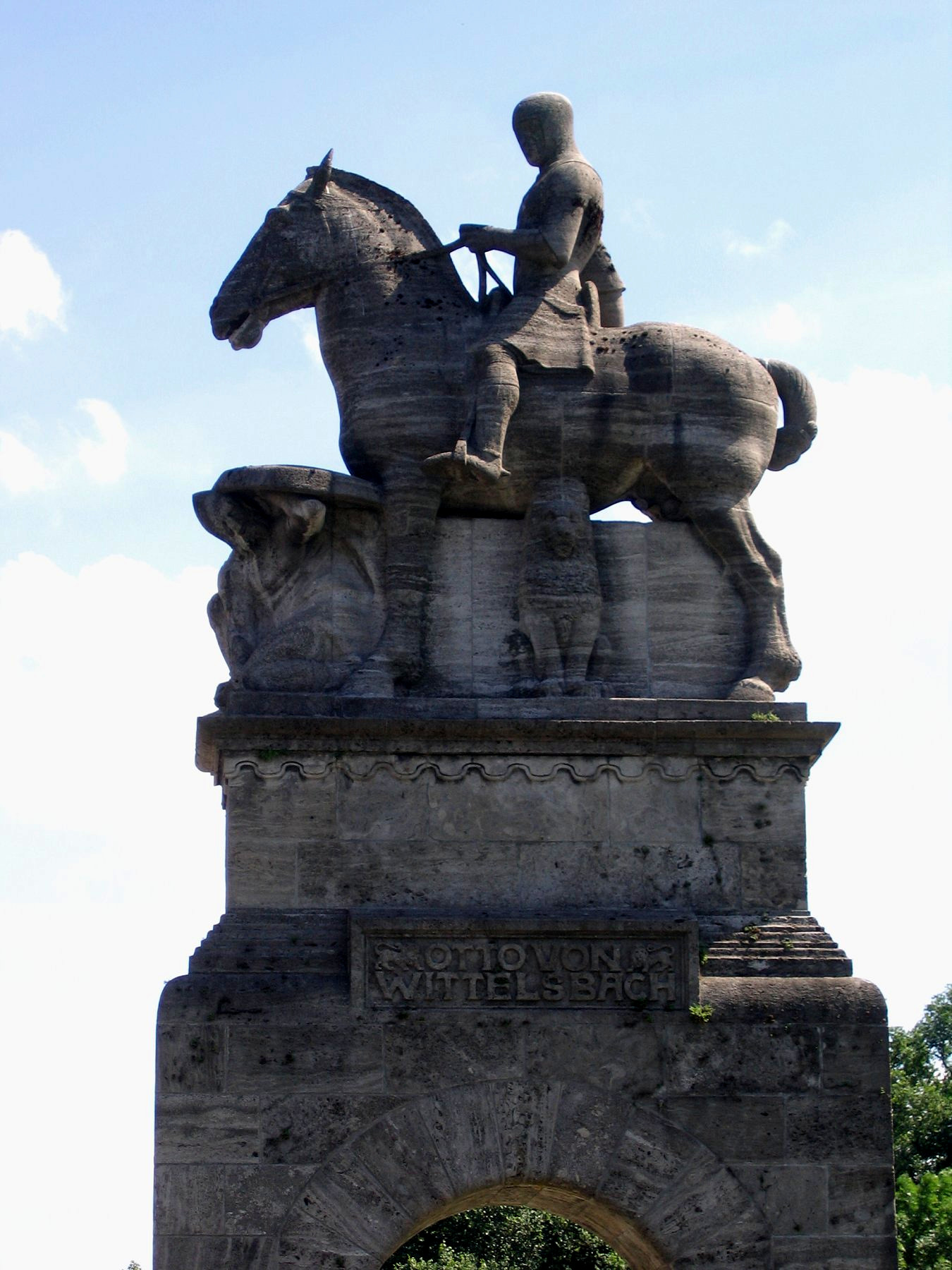
Equestrian statue of Otto I by Georg Wrba

The bridge was initially built as a wooden bridge in 1874 and named after the Bavarian Wittelsbach dynasty. In 1904, the bridge was re-built out of concrete and steel.

The bridge is famous for its sculpture of Duke Otto I, added in 1904. The sculpture was designed by Theodor Fischer, who also designed ornaments on other Munich bridges such as the Prinzregeten.

Munich's homeless population frequently camp underneath the bridge. Police cleared a homeless camp from underneath the bridge in November 2018.

The bridge was featured in the Euro 2020 football tournament logo, representing the city of Munich.
