= Roider Jackl =

German performer (1906–1975)

- Born: Jakob Roider; July 17, 1906; Weihmichl, German empire
- Died: May 8, 1975 (aged 68) Freising, West Germany
- Genres: Bavarian folk music, Gstanzl
- Instruments: Voice

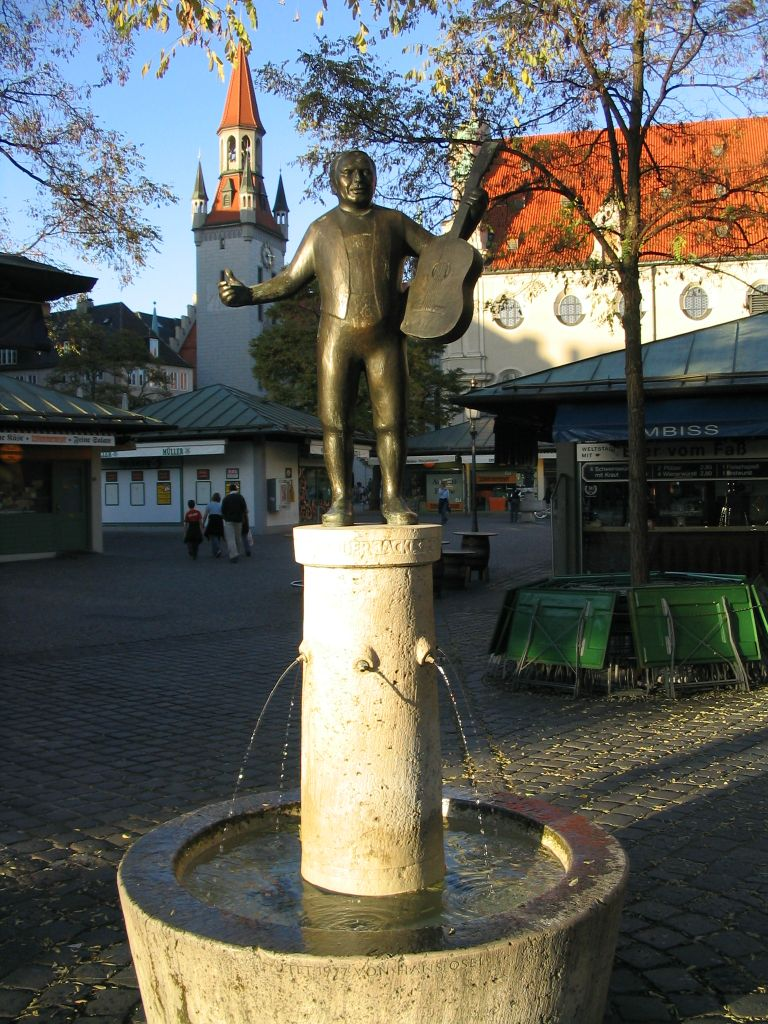
Roider Jackl fountain in Munich, Viktualienmarkt

Roider Jackl (17 June 1906 in Weihmichl – 8 May 1975 in Freising; real name: Jakob Roider) was a German performer, singer, and folk singer, who performed in Bavarian language.

He became famous in the 1950s especially because of the writing and performing of Gstanzls (short Bavarian mocking songs). A Gstanzl normally consists of four lines, sometimes eight, and is sung in dialect. He performed for example in the Bayerischer Rundfunk and in the Nockherberg. He was a master of the political Gstanzl. Karl Valentin was among his admirers.
