= Mariahilfplatz =

Square in Munich, Germany

Coordinates: 48°07′33″N 11°35′01″E

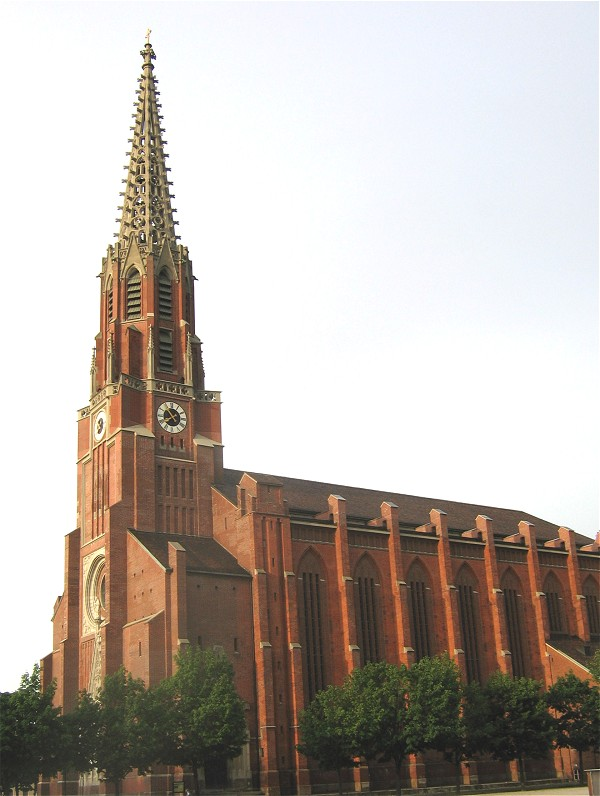
Mariahilf Church

The Mariahilfplatz is a town square on the right bank of the River Isar in the district of Au in Munich, Germany.

Centrally located in the suburb of Au, the Mariahilfplatz is a well visited and active place. One of the largest fairs in Munich, the Auer Dult, occurs here three times per year.

The square is dominated by the neo-gothic Mariahilfkirche (Mariahilf Church) which is situated right in the centre. East of the square behind the monastery of the School Sisters of Notre Dame is the Auer Mühlbach (Millstream of Au), one of the remaining brooks in Munich. Also at the Mariahilfplatz are the Landratsamt München (Administrative office of the Landkreis München) with the public health office, the Maria-Hilf School, Police Department 21, REFUGIO Munich (a consultation and treatment centre for refugees and torture victims) and Neudeck, a prison for women and young people.

== Transportation ==
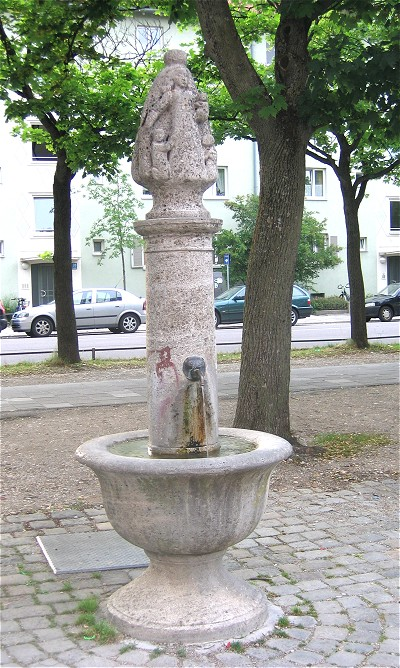
Fountain in Mariahilfplatz

South of the square is Ohlmüllerstraße (Ohlmüller street), which connects the west side of the Isar with Au and Giesing. Due to the nature of the city centre car parking spaces are often very hard to come by, particularly during the Auer Dult.

One can get to the Mariahilfplatz by public transport: Line 17 by tram stopping at Mariahilfplatz, Metrobus 52 stopping at Mariahilfplatz and Schweigerstraße (Schweiger Street), and bus 62 stopping at Schweigerstraße.

== Surroundings ==
The following can be found neighbouring directly and indirectly:

- The Isar and its wetlands
- The Nockherberg
- The Paulaner Brewery
- The Deutsches Museum on the Museuminsel (Museum island)
- The Glockenbachviertel (left of the Isar)
- Gärtnerplatzviertel (left of the Isar)

== Miscellaneous ==
A farmer's market takes place twice per week.
