= Au-Haidhausen =

Borough of Munich, Germany

Coordinates: 48°07′55″N 11°35′20″E

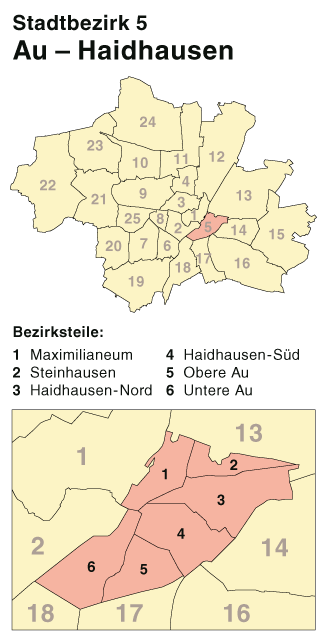
Borough 5 Au-Haidhausen, Location in Munich

Au-Haidhausen (German pronunciation: [ˈaʊ haɪtˈhaʊzn̩]; Central Bavarian: Au-Haidhausn) is the 5th borough of the German city of Munich, Bavaria. It is formed by the Au and Haidhausen districts.

== Location ==
Au lies opposite the Altstadt of the city on the easterly plain tract of the Isar. Haidhausen is above Au on the Isar's uplands. Au-Haidhausen borders Bogenhausen to the north, Berg am Laim to the east, Obergiesing to the south, level with the flow of the Isar at Untergiesing, ending in the west at the river.

== History and description ==
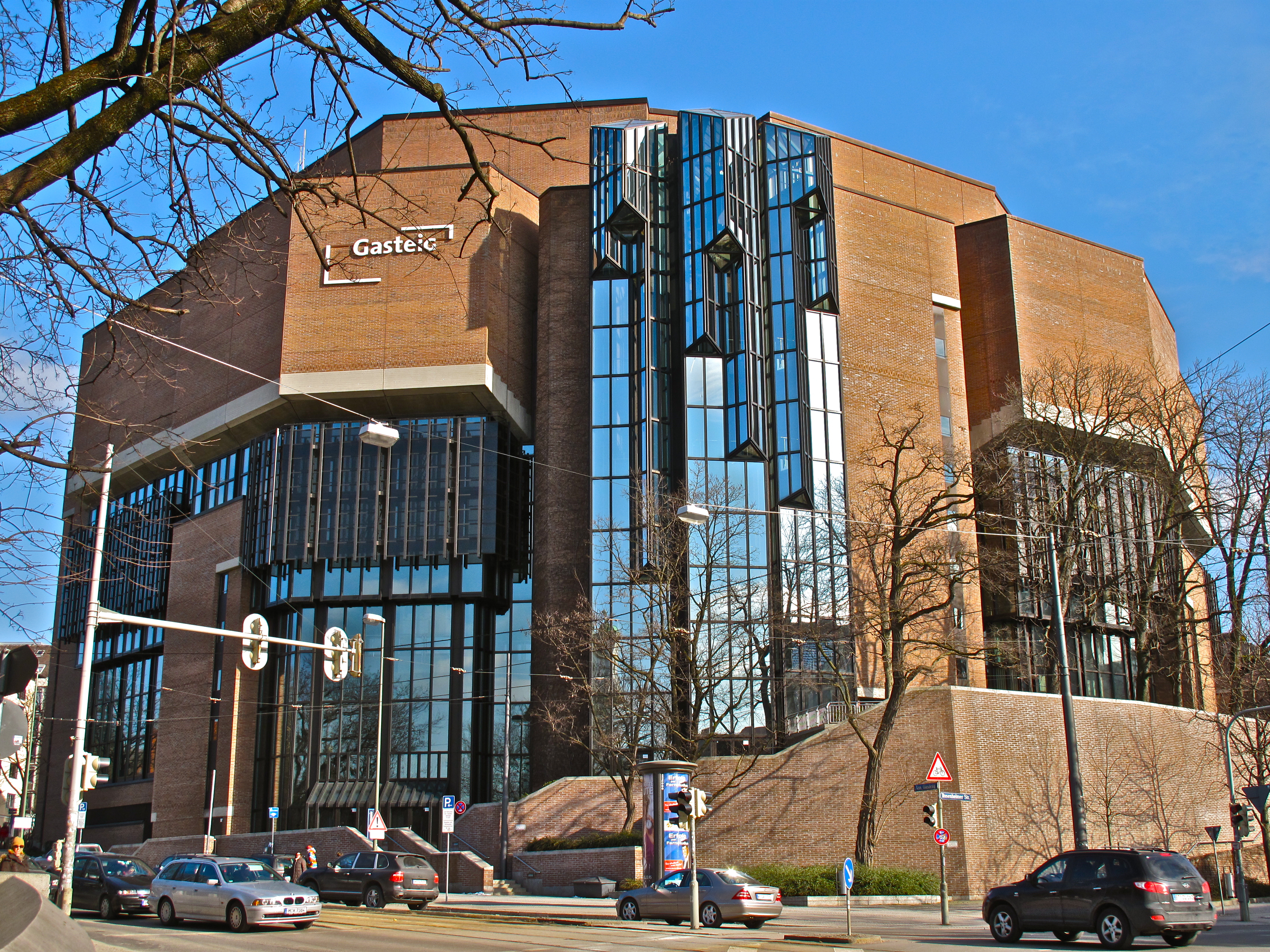
Gasteig cultural center

Au and Haidhausen used to be hostel areas for trade workers and day labourers outside of the medieval town walls of Munich. Both formerly independent municipalities were incorporated into the City of Munich on 1 October 1854 and developed into suburbs during the Gründerzeit. Many breweries were located on the high banks of the Isar, thus right on the edge of the terrace. These were good locations for deep natural water sources and beer cellars; for this reason, the name "Keller" (cellar) is still used to refer to the brewery-restaurants nearby. Near Rosenheimer Platz on Rosenheimer street stood the Bürgerbräukeller, the location of the first assassination attempt on Adolf Hitler. Today, one of the largest breweries in Munich can be found there: Paulaner, in Au. Nearby, the Gasteig marks the transition to the inner city, a cultural center which hosts the Munich Philharmonic Orchestra, parts of the University of Music and Performing Arts Munich, the Volkshochschule, Munich's municipal library and important events such as the Filmfest München and the Munich Biennale.

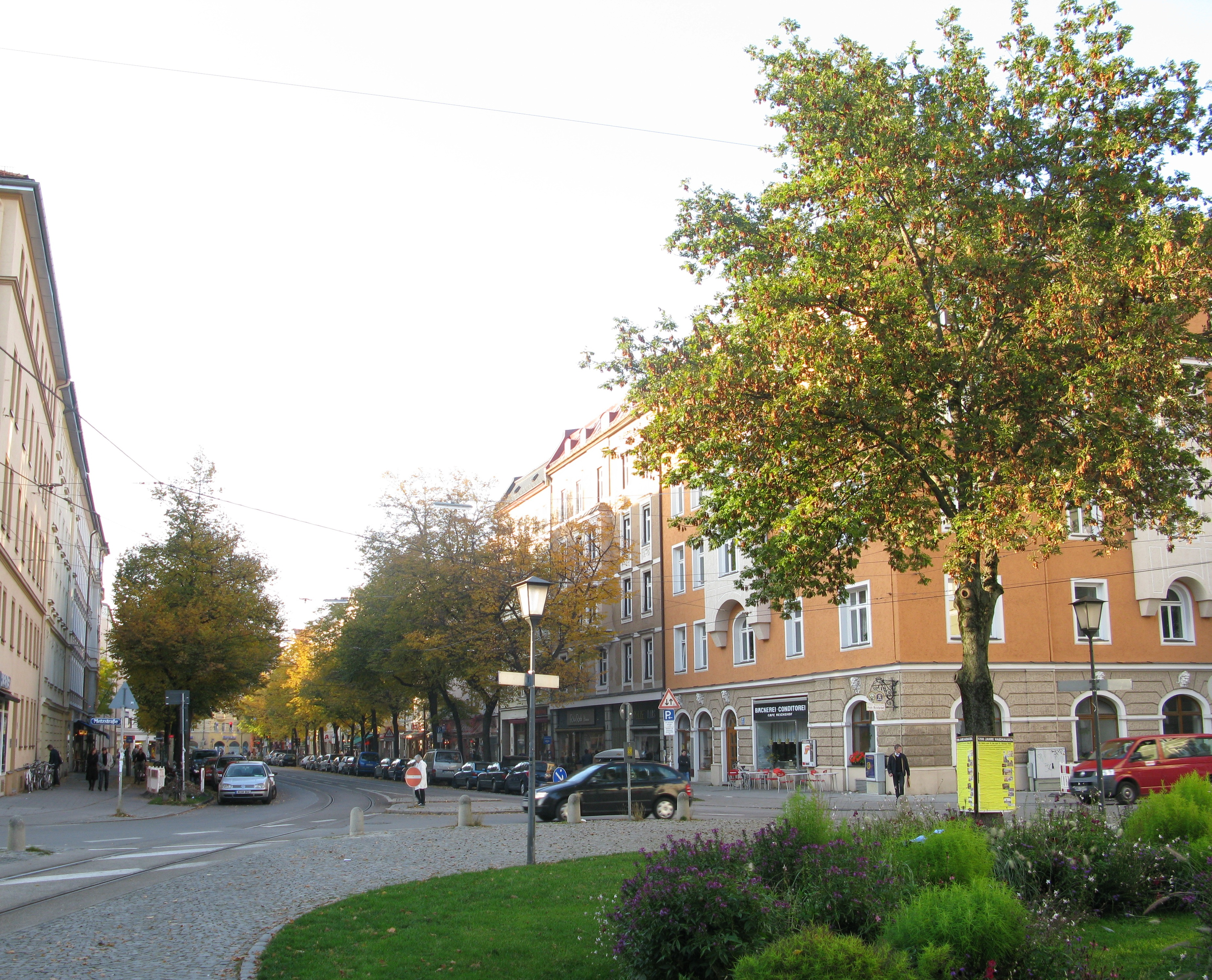
Neighborhood in Haidhausen

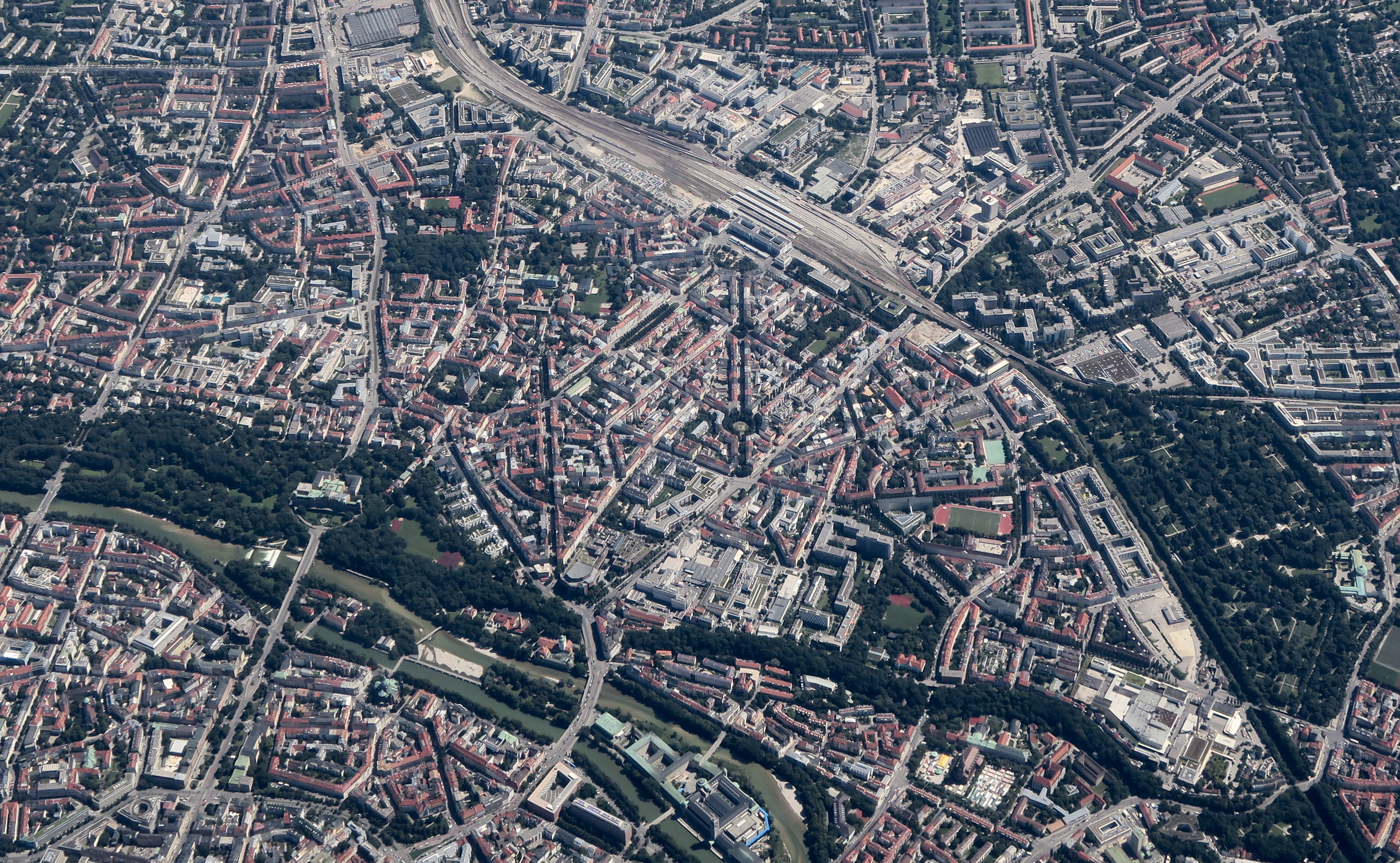
Au-Haidhausen enclosed by Munich East station (top) and the Isar (bottom)

Even though the structural integrity of buildings in Au was heavily compromised during the Second World War and only a fifth of buildings dated before 1919 still stand, the historical townscape of Haidhausen remains largely intact. Of high constructional significance is the Franzosenviertel ("the French quarter"), so called because of given street names to locations of victory in battles of the German-French War. The existence of good condition housing lead to Haidhausen becoming the second largest area of redevelopment in the 1970s, alongside Schwanthalerhöhe. This property redevelopment and revaluation triggered by the upgrade of accommodation lead to not only restructuring of a suburb to the outskirts of the area, but also a change of image, thus putting Haidhausen in competition with Schwabing as a trendy area to live in Munich.

The balanced mixture of accommodation and living in Au and Haidhausen has shifted towards housing; this is due to the outsourcing of otherwise bothersome trades. Most jobs in the district lie in service industries and other public areas.

Haidhausen accommodates the Bayerische Landtag in the Maximilianeum, the Klinikum rechts der Isar and the Wiener Markt. On the northern border the Friedensengel ("peace angel") towers above the city on the Isar plateau. If one follows Prinzregentenstraße from there to the east, around 100 metres along on the right hand side is the Villa Stuck, that the "Malerfürst" ("Painter prince") Franz von Stuck allowed to be constructed according to his own blueprints. As of 2004 the entirely reconditioned buildings of the Villa and the former studio is now an art museum. Further east down Prinzregentenstraße lies the Prinzregententheater, one of the most striking Art Nouveau theatre buildings in Germany; adjacent to which is the Prinzregentenstadion, which serves as a popular ice skating venue in winter. With the Maria-Theresia-Gymnasium in the south the district also accommodates one of the few German Schools of Excellence.

With the Auer Dult taking place three times per year at the Mariahilfplatz, and the tapping of Bock at the Nockherberg in the Salvatorkeller of the Paulaner brewery on the Hochstraße (High street), rebuilt after heavy fire damage, Au has a significant amount of traditional daily culture.

== Statistics ==
(As of 31 December, Inhabitants with principal residence)

Year	Inhabitants.	of which Foreigners	Area (ha.)	Inhabitants per ha.	Source
2000	52,028	13,257 (25,5%)	421.75	123	Statistisches Taschenbuch München 2001. pdf-Download
2001	51,947	12,954 (24.9%)	421.75	123	Statistisches Taschenbuch München 2002. pdf-Download
2002	52,000	13,007 (25%)	421.75	123	Statistisches Taschenbuch München 2003. pdf-Download
2003	51,636	12,759 (24.7%)	421.75	122	Statistisches Taschenbuch München 2004. pdf-Download
2004	51,383	12,307 (24.0%)	421.78	122	Statistisches Taschenbuch München 2005. pdf-Download
2005	52,502	12,322 (23.5%)	421.79	124	Statistisches Taschenbuch München 2006. pdf-Download

(Statistical Pocket Book Munich)

== Literature ==
Helmuth Stahleder: Von Allach bis Zamilapark. Names and historical dates of the history of Munich and its incorporated suburbs. Stadtarchiv München, ed. München: Buchendorfer Verlag 2001. ISBN 3-934036-46-5
