= Maria-Theresia-Gymnasium =

Coordinates: 48°07′28″N 11°35′19″E

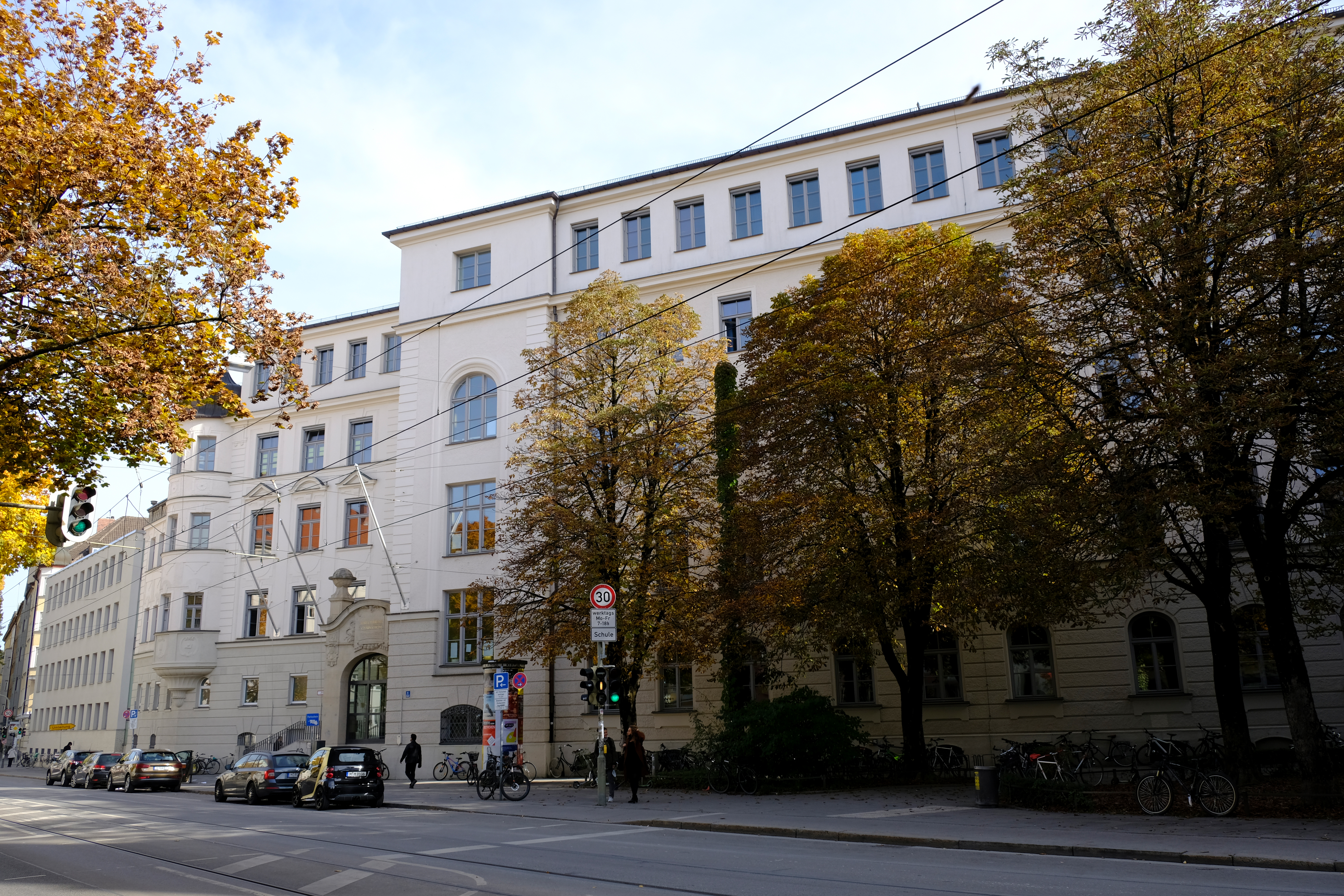
Maria-Theresia-Gymnasium

Maria-Theresia-Gymnasium is one of Munich's oldest schools. It is situated on Regerplatz in the Munich district Au.

Founded in 1899 as a Kreisrealschule, it became a Kreis

oberrealschule in 1940 and a state-run Gymnasium in 1965. It currently holds around 900 students mainly in a natural scientific-mathematical, but as of late also a modern language branch.

In 1998, a gifted student class was started. In a partnership with LMU Munich gifted students receive so-called „Enrichment“ classes, during which they can carry out experiments themselves at the biology and physics departments under supervision by known professors.

The school is host to student exchanges with France, Sweden and Poland.

A new building with cafeteria and several new specialist rooms was built in 2008, made necessary by the adoption of the 8-year Gymnasium in many German states.

== Notable students ==
- Corbinian Böhm, artist, student from 1980 to 1984
- Heinz Rühmann, actor
- Karl Seebach, mathematician
- Markus Engel, Hotelier
