= Auer Dult =

Festival in Munich, Germany

Coordinates: 48°07′30″N 11°34′59″E

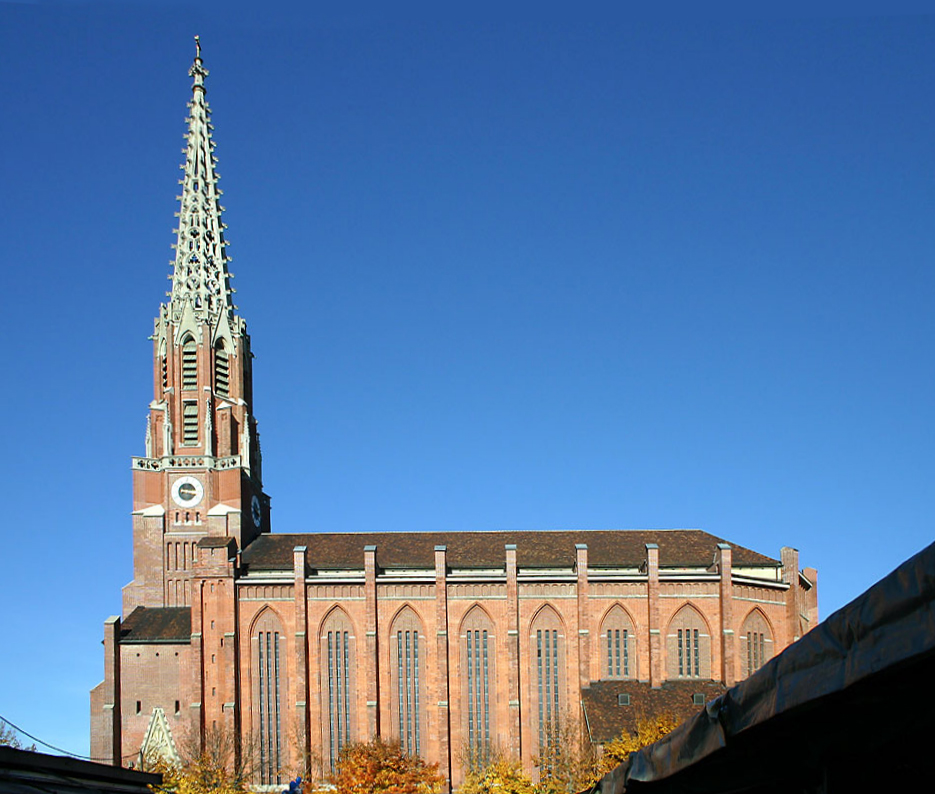
Mariahilf Church

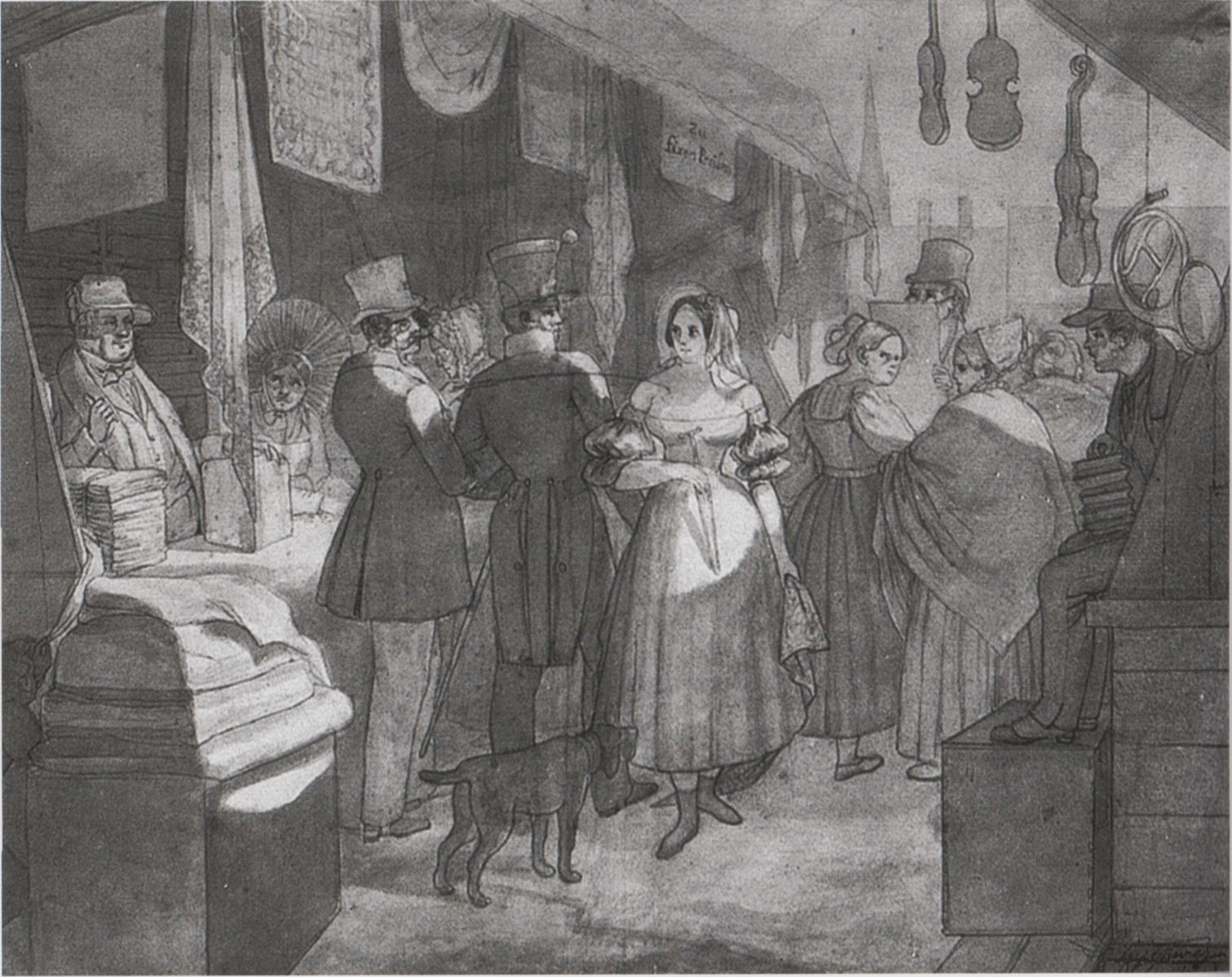
Auf der Dult, drawing by Carl Spitzweg, circa 1838

The Auer Dult is a traditional fair in Munich, combining a market and a German style folk festival.

It takes place three times per year on the Mariahilfplatz in the Munich district of Au, fuelled by around three hundred traders and showmen, by the rule. Both sections - market and funfair - are separated by the neo-gothic Mariahilfkirche (Mariahilf Church) in the very middle of the square. In contrast to the Oktoberfest and the Munich Spring Festival (Münchner Frühlingsfest), the Auer Dult is much less touristy, but way more local, discreet and calm. In the course of the year, around 300,000 visitors are counted.

The first fair of the year, the so-called Maidult (May fair) starts on the first Saturday of the month. Jakobidult takes place in late July and early August (beginning on the Saturday after the feast day of St. James) and Kirchweihdult occurs round the middle of October, from Saturday prior to Kirchweih till the following Sunday. Each one lasts nine days.

== History ==
Dult is an old word in East Upper German to describe a traditional fair.

Munich's Jakobidult (round St. Jacob's / James's name day, 25 July) was first established in 1310 on the meadow on which the modern day Sankt-Jakobs Platz was established. The second fair of the year in town having been the now famous and touristy Christmas market. From 1791 the former occurred on the stretch of Kaufinger and Neuhauser streets. In 1796 Elector Karl Theodor bestowed on the nearby suburb of Au, located on a floodplain opposite town (i.e., east of the Isar) and a small village at the time, the right to hold a fair (Dult) of its own twice a year. From this came the name and necessary distinction Auer Dult. Starting in 1799, the locals held fairs in May and October, modern Maidult (May fair) and Kirchweihdult (parish fair). After Au's incorporation to the City of Munich in 1854, the Jakobidult was moved there also, creating the known triplet of events.

Except the mid- and post-war years of 1943-1946 and in 2020 due to the COVID-19 pandemic, the fair has taken place three times per year since 1905.

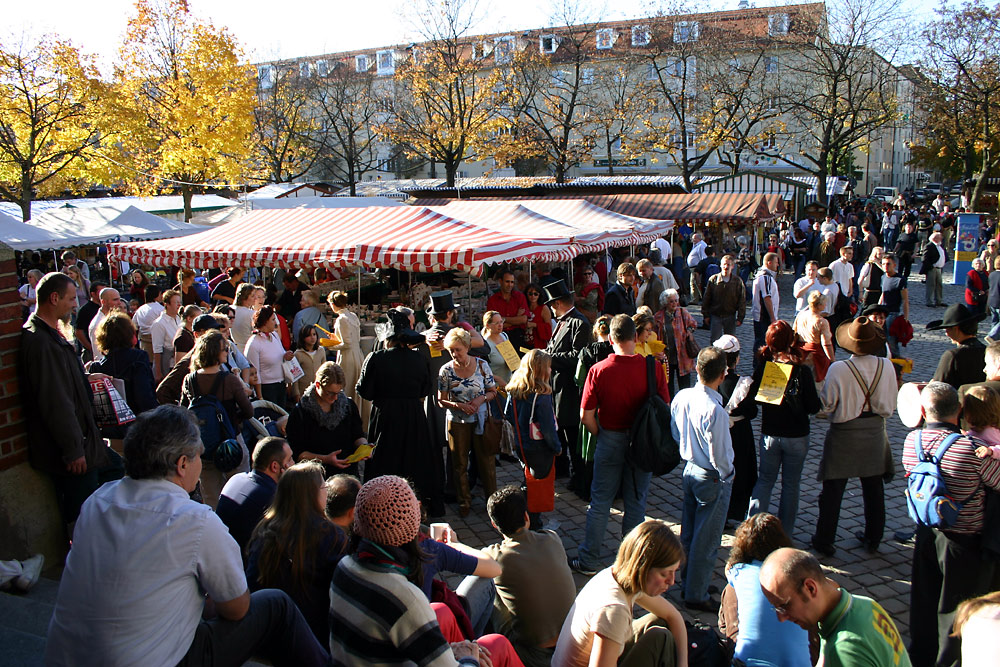
The Auer Dult market

== Folk Festival ==
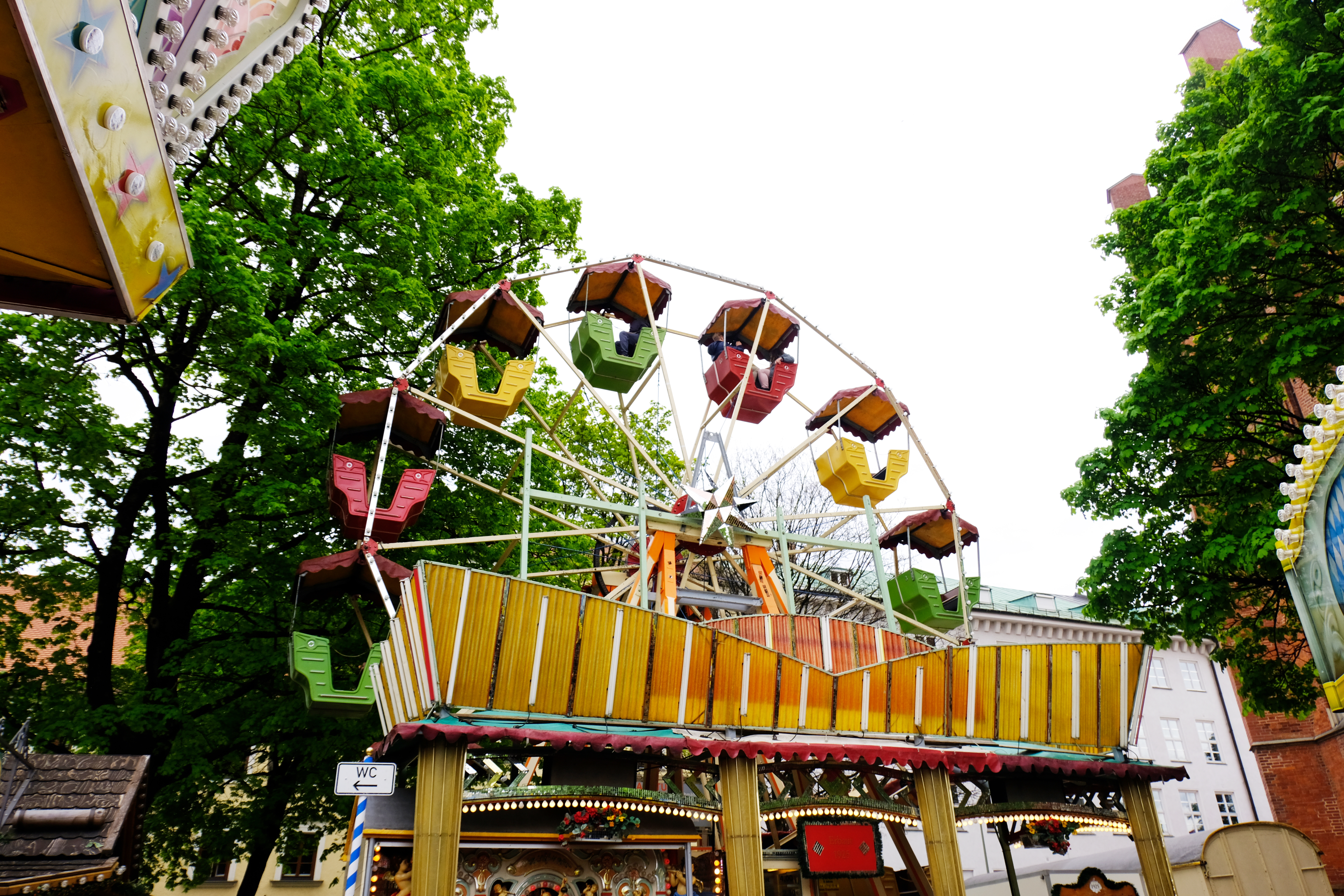
The small Ferris wheel (2019, year of last appearance)

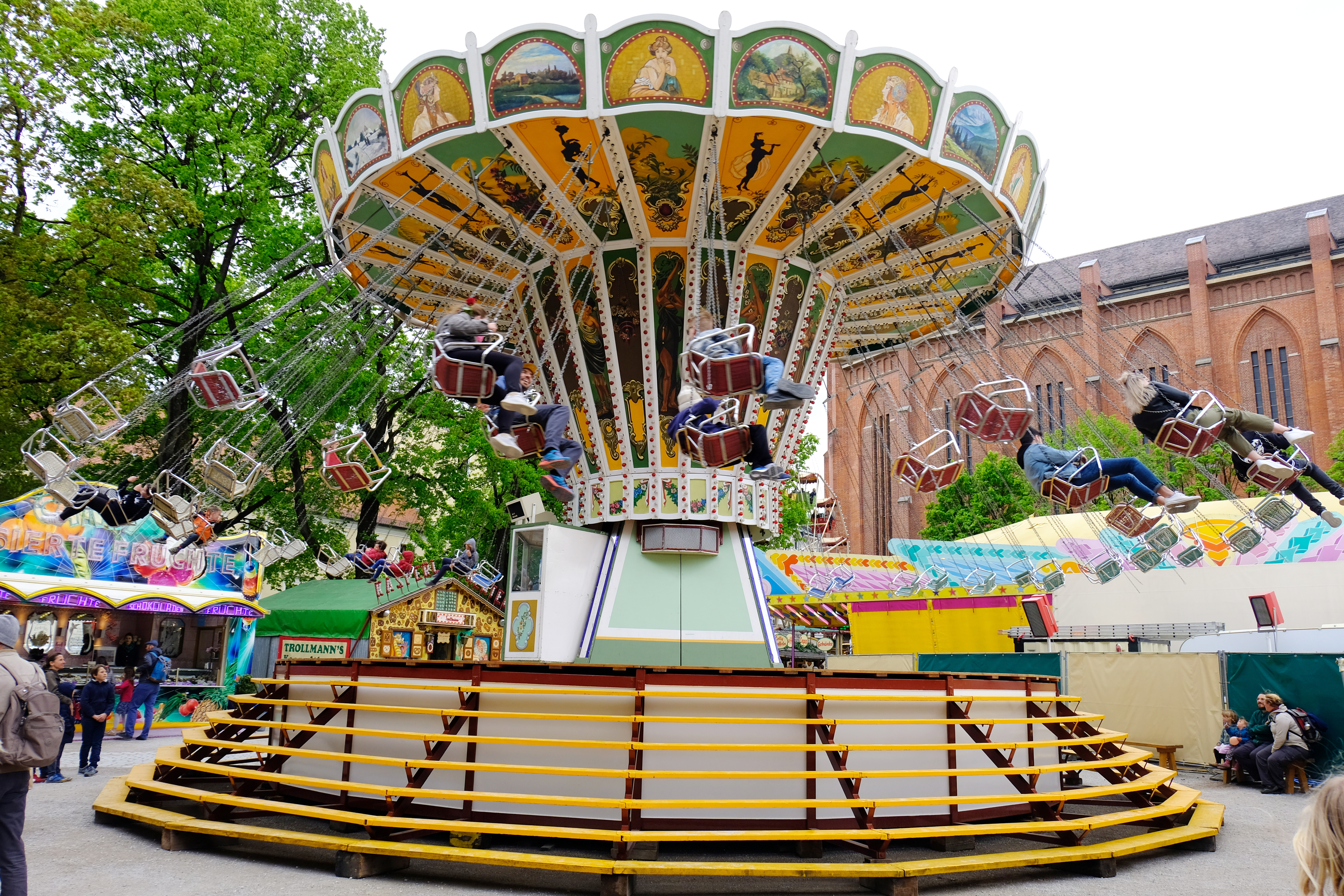
The chairoplane (2019)

Next to the area of the Standl is a second one, where there are typical fairground rides. Until including 2019 there also used to be a small Ferris wheel, called the Russenrad (Russian's wheel). Visitors find a chairoplane, a child's roundabout, a swing boat, a horse riding track, dodgems and shooting galleries. There are also various takeaways and a beer tent which offers typical Bavarian specialities like the famous and much-beloved Steckerlfisch.
