= Au (Munich) =

District in Munich, Bavaria, Germany

Coordinates: 48.12°N 11.587°E

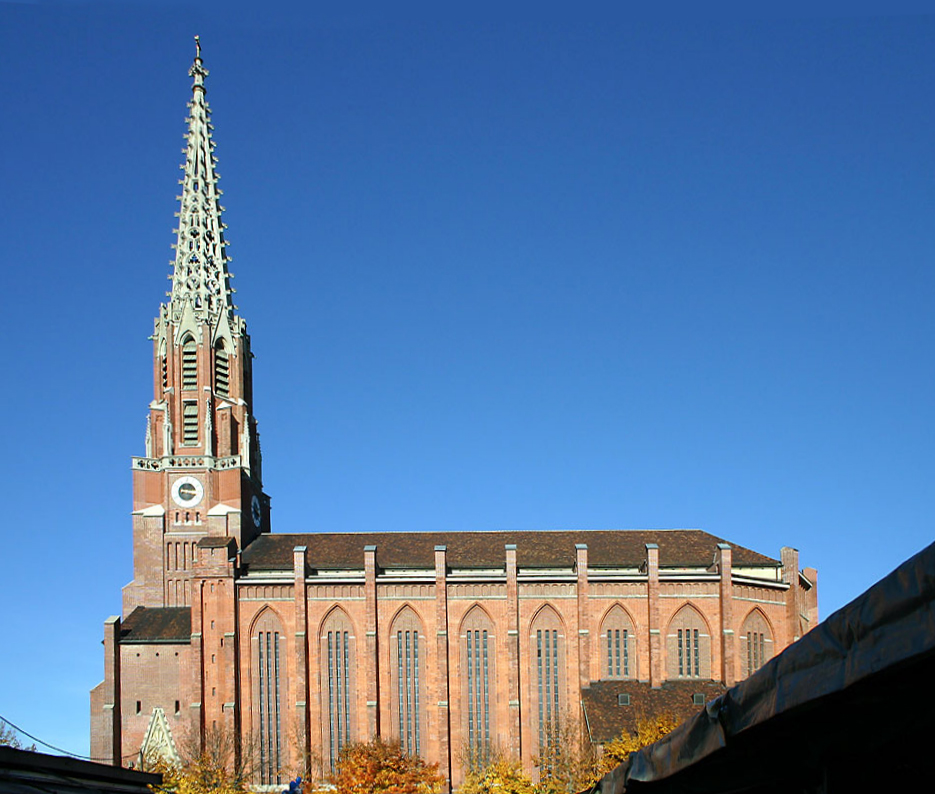
Mariahilf Church

Au (German pronunciation: [aʊ]) is a district in the south eastern plain tract of the German city of Munich in Bavaria. Au extends from the Deutsches Museum in the north and along the Isar up to Wittelsbacherbrücke (Wittelsbacher Bridge) in the south.

In the centre of the area the Auer Dult takes place three times a year on the Mariahilfplatz, which is the largest annual market in Munich.

Bordering boroughs of the city are Ludwigsvorstadt-Isarvorstadt and Altstadt-Lehel on the western side of the Isar, Untergiesing-Harlaching in the south and Giesing in the south-east. The Haidhausen district lies to the east and along with Au, forms the Au-Haidhausen borough of the city.

Au was first documented on 12 December 1340 as "Awe ze Gysingen", with Awe meaning "Land on water". In 1808 Au was made a town as Vorstadt Au ("Suburb of Au"). In 1818, along with Untergiesing (what the settlement at Nockherberg had been referred to as), Au formed its own urban municipality. On 1 October 1854 the district was incorporated into Munich.

Hans-Georg Schwarzenbeck, a 1974 World Cup champion, has operated a stationery shop in Au for over 20 years.

The operatic soprano Clara Vespermann (1799–1827) was born in Hau.

== Coat of arms of the former "Vorstadt Au" ==
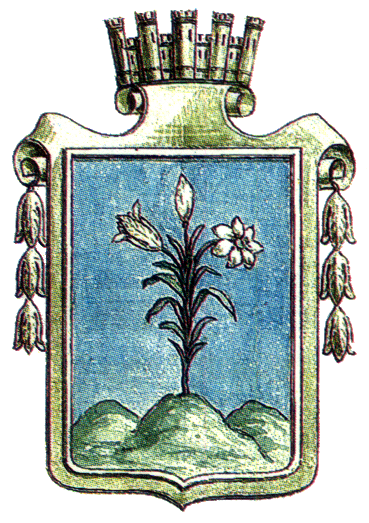
Coat of arms of "Vorstadt Au"

After the municipality had been made a town in 1808 it was given its own coat of arms on 25 July 1808 by the Royal Bavarian Landes-Commissariat. It is likely that coat of arms also applied to Haidhausen.

Description: Three silver lilies with green styling and 6 leaves on a blue background.

Meaning: In reference to the Lilienberg Monastery in Au.

After the incorporation into the city of Munich in 1854, all rights to the coat of arms belonged to the Munich city council.

== Literature ==
- Helmuth Stahleder: Von Allach bis Zamilapark. Names and historical dates of the history of Munich and its incorporated suburbs. Stadtarchiv München, ed. München: Buchendorfer Verlag 2001. ISBN 3-934036-46-5
- Herrmann Wilhelm: "In der Münchner Vorstadt Au - Vergessene Lebenswelten des siebzehnten, achtzehnten und neunzehnten Jahrhunderts". MünchenVerlag ISBN 978-3-937090-00-9
