= Clara Vespermann =

German operatic soprano

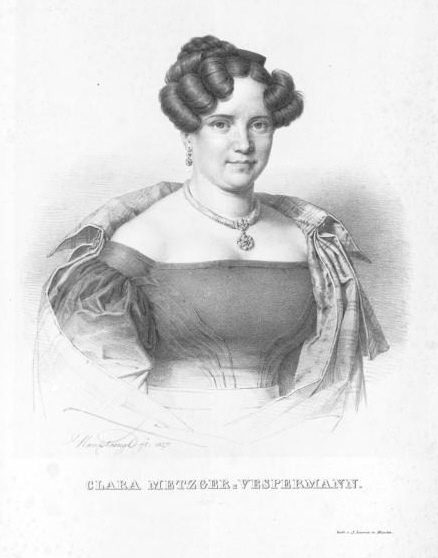
Klara Vespermann (1799–1827)

Clara Vespermann, born Clara Metzger, also Clara Metzger-Vespermann, (13 April 1799 – 6 March 1827) was a German operatic soprano.

== Life ==
Born in Hau, Vespermann performed at the Cuvilliés Theatre as a child. The conductor and composer Peter Winter trained her in singing and took her into his family as a foster daughter. In 1816, she made her debut at the Court Opera in the German premiere of Winter's opera Zaira, first performed in London in 1805, and immediately enjoyed extraordinary success.

On 28 February 1817, she sang in the world premiere of Winter's Maometto II and on 7 May 1821, in that of Johann Kaspar Aiblinger's Rodrigo und Ximene. Guest appearances took her to the Staatsoper Unter den Linden, the Dresden Court Opera and the Opernhaus Leipzig. At La Scala, she gave a guest performance in the world premiere of Winter's opera I due Valdomiri on 26 December 1817, among others.

From 1819, she continued her career at the Munich Court Opera. On 5 April 1822, she sang the role of Agathe in the Munich premiere of Der Freischütz. The composer Carl Maria von Weber subsequently described her performance as "unique and unattainable".

Vespermann was married to the baritone Wilhelm Vespermann (1784-1834) and mother of the writer Maria Vespermann (1823–1886). On 6 March 1827, a stroke ended her life at the age of 27.

== Grave site ==
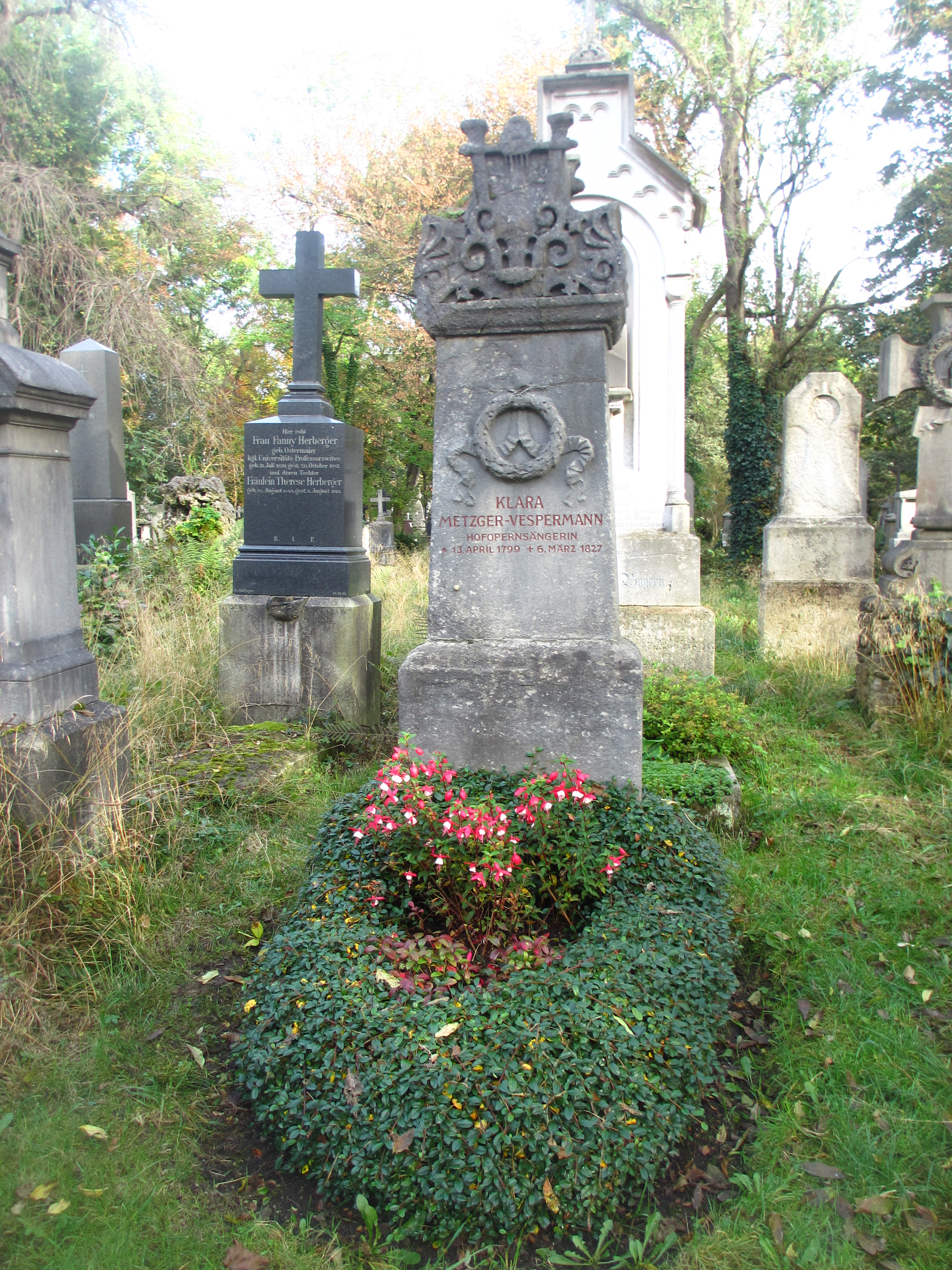
Klara Vespermann's grave at the Alter Südfriedhof in Munich

The gravesite of Klara Vespermann is located at the Alter Südfriedhof in Munich (Gravesite 18 - Row 14 - Place 11). 48°7′39.70″N 11°33′51.63″E.
