= Gstanzl =

Mocking song in Austria and Bavaria

The Gstanzl (Austro-Bavarian for Gestanzel, "stanza") is a traditional type of mocking songs particularly known in the Austrian-Bavarian regions. A Gstanzl normally consists of four lines, sometimes eight, and is sung in dialect. They can either be sung at certain dances (Ländler, Steirische), or are sung without dancing.

Gstanzln (plural of Gstanzl) are normally only sung by men. The content of Gstanzln covers all areas of the life of simple people, normally of people from the countryside. The Gstanzln often have punch lines and are generally humorous. They are mocking authorities like the state, emperor, the land owners, the church or the peculiarities of other people and especially women.

At occasions, where multiple Gstanzln-singers meet and alternatingly sing a Gstanzl, they try to respond and outwit each other. Good Gstanzl-singers can go for hours without repeating themselves.

Depending on the region, a Gstanzl may also be called Schnadderhüpfl, Schanderhagge, Stückl, Possen-, Trutz- und Spitzliedln, Schleifer, Haarbrecher-Gsangln, Plopper- und Plepper(lieder), Schwatzliedln, Flausen and Schmetterliedln, G'setzln, Basseln, Vierzeilige, Kurschza Liadlan, Schelmeliedle, Chorze Liedle, Rappedietzle, Schlumperliedla or Rundâs.

The nature of Gstanzl is close to rapping.

== Famous Gstanzl singers ==
- Roider Jackl (17 June 1906 – 8 May 1975)
