= Paulaner =

German brewery

Paulaner Brauerei GmbH & Co. KGaA
- Interactive map of Paulaner Brauerei GmbH & Co. KGaA
- Location: Munich, Bavaria, Germany
- Coordinates: 48°7′18.07″N 11°35′4.14″E
- Opened: 1634
- Key people: Jörg Biebernick (chairman); Stefan Fischbach; Raphael Rauer; Andreas Steinfatt
- Website: paulaner.com

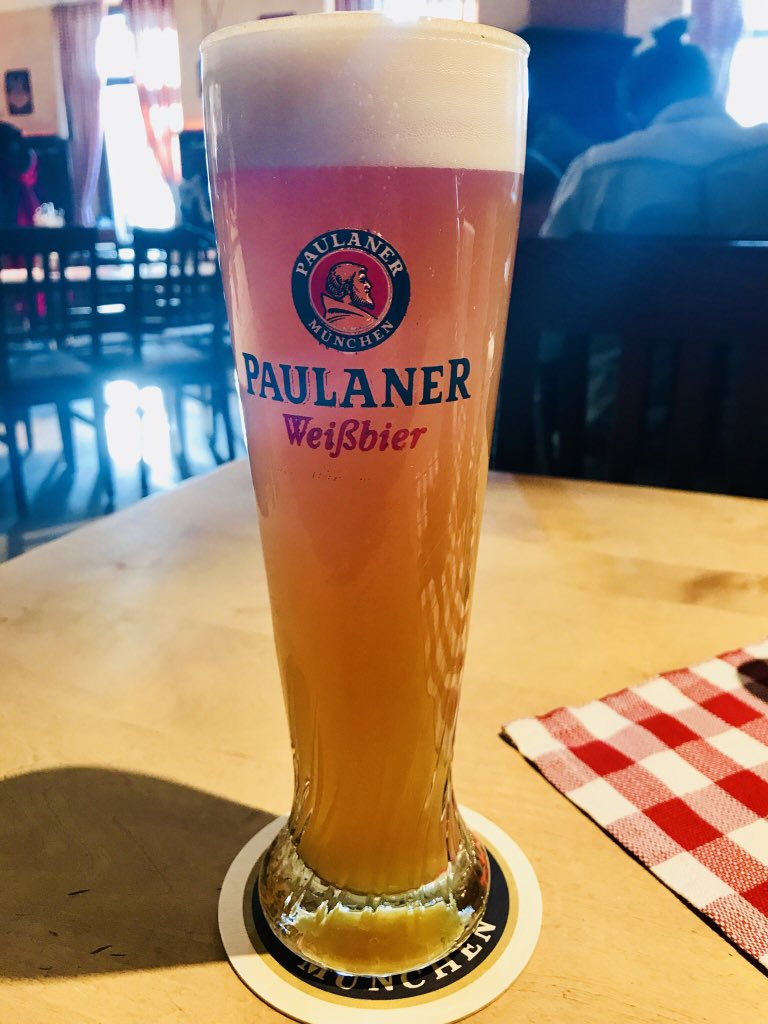
Paulaner Hefe-weißbier

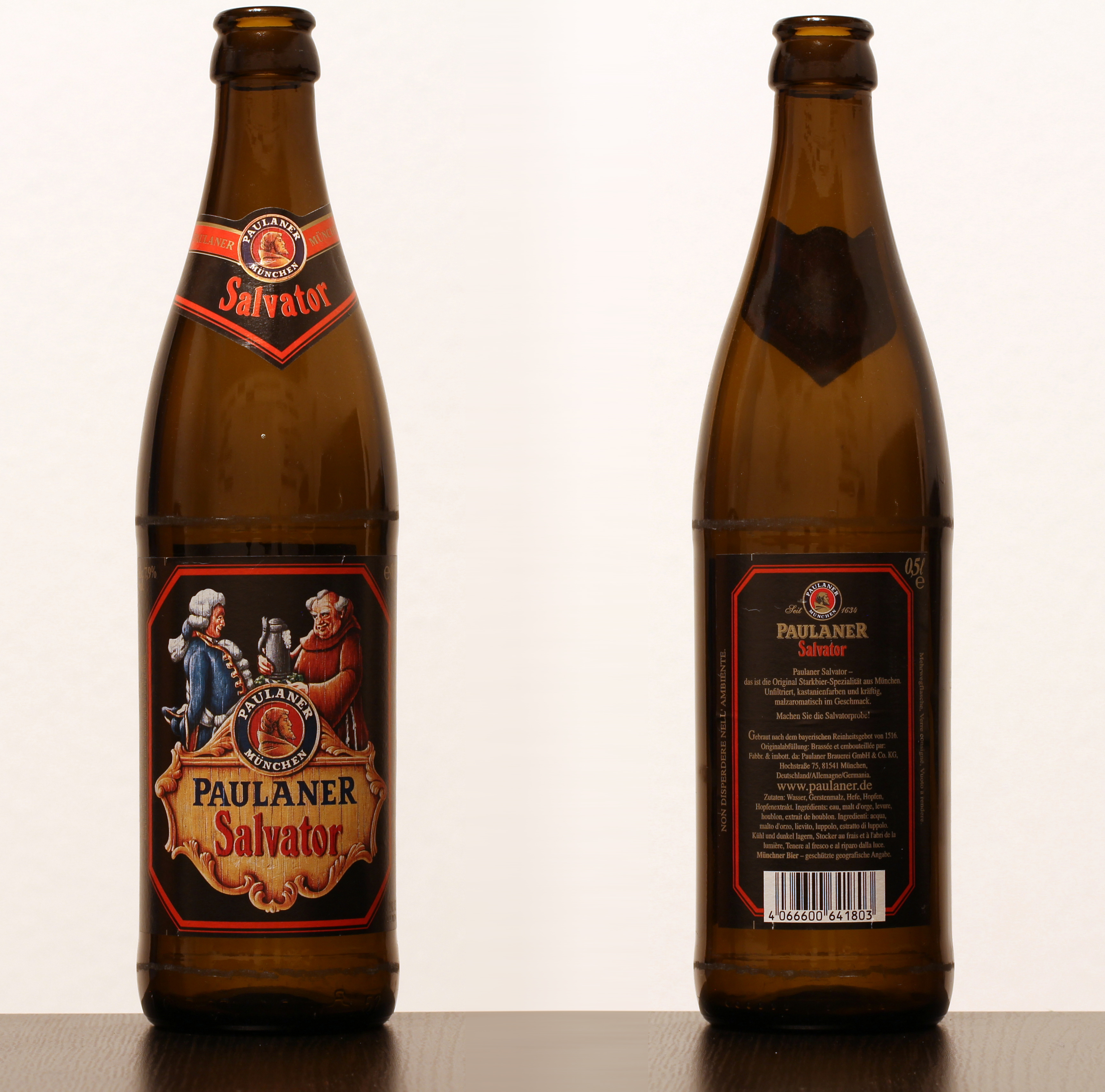
Paulaner Salvator

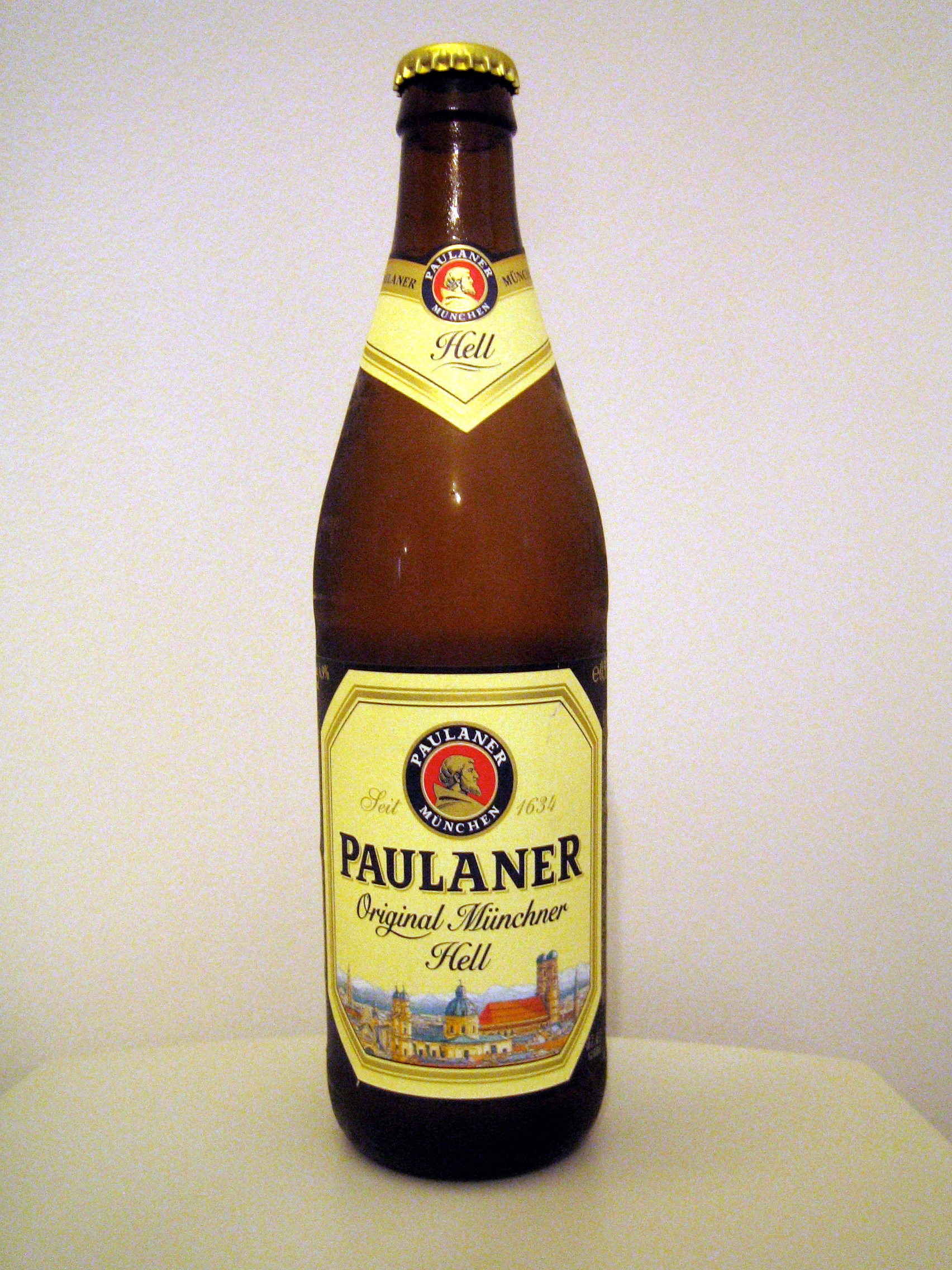
Paulaner Hell

Paulaner is a German brewery, established in 1634 in Munich by the Paulaner Order of mendicant friars. Now owned by the Schörghuber family, it is one of the six breweries which provides beer for Oktoberfest. Paulaner ranks number six among Germany's best-selling beers.

== History ==
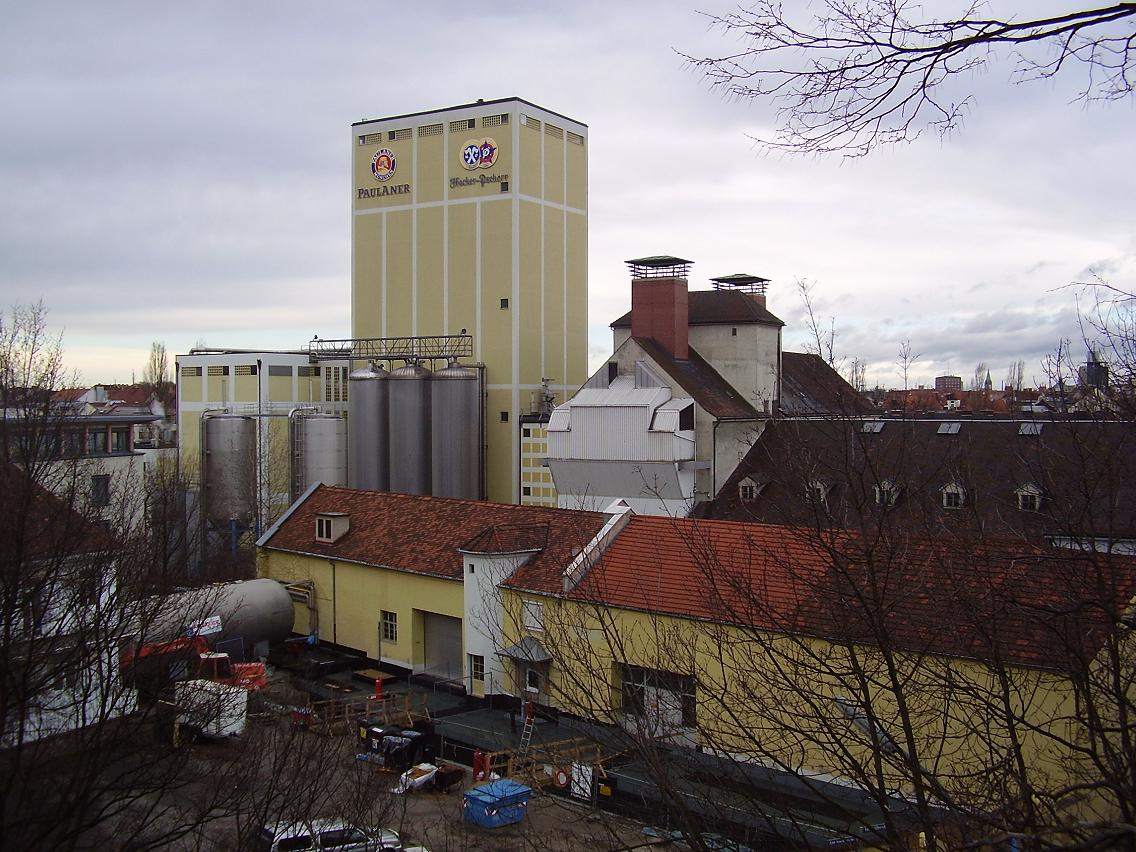
Former industrial areas of the Paulaner brewery in Munich

The brewery was founded by the Paulaner Order (the name in Germany for the Order of Minims) after whom it was named. The monks in the Order's Neudeck ob der Au Monastery in Munich brewed a strong beer, the Paulaner Salvator, naturally according to the Purity Law of 1516. Whatever they did not drink themselves was given to the poor or sold in the cloister pub. As ever-larger numbers of people in Munich began drinking the beer, civilian brewers voiced their complaints to the city council on February 24, 1634, about competition from the monastery. This letter is considered the first documented evidence of the Paulaner Brewery and is to this day used as the founding date of the brewery.

In 1751, the Paulaner monks were officially allowed by elector Maximilian III Joseph to publicly serve their beer on the day celebrating the father of their order, Francis of Paola: April 2. This was named "fathers saint beer" (St. Vater Bier in german), which by time became slurred into Salvator. As a show of gratitude, they invited the Bavarian Electors to enjoy their first sip of the eponymous brew, Salvator. It is a ritual that still takes place when the head of the Paulaner Brewery hands the first one-litre measure of Salvator to the Bavarian minister president at the kick-off of the Munich "Starkbierfest" (strong beer festival). In 1780 the brewery was granted an unrestricted license to serve its beer.

The Paulaner Brewery was always developing new techniques: One of the first Carl von Linde ice machines is used in 1881. From that point on, beer could be brewed all year round.

In World War II, large parts of the brewery were destroyed by bombs. Reconstruction lasted until 1950. In 1994, the merger to Paulaner Brauerei AG followed.

In 1979 the Schörghuber family took over the majority of Paulaner Brewery, and the entrepreneurial family maintains that majority to this day.

The first non-alcoholic Weissbier in the world, "Waitzinger Weissbier", began to be produced in 1986 by the Paulaner Brewery. Today it is called "Hefe Weißbier Non-Alcoholic".

Paulaner Bräuhaus Consult GmbH opened the first brewhouse on Kapuzinerplatz in Munich in 1989 as the headquarters of Paulaner taverns with its own in-house brewing operation. More brewhouses followed in Beijing, Shanghai, Singapore, Jakarta, and St. Petersburg.

In 1999, the brewery was renamed to Paulaner GmbH und Co. KG. On July 4, 2017, the former Paulaner Brauerei GmbH & Co. KG was merged with Brau Holding International GmbH & Co. KGaA and was transferred to Paulaner Brauerei Gruppe GmbH & Co. KGaA.

The Paulaner Brewery is the management company of Paulaner Brauerei Gruppe GmbH & Co. KGaA. Seventy percent of the company is owned by the Schörghuber Unternehmensgruppe and 30% by the Dutch Heineken International B.V.

For the first time in history, Paulaner exported one million hectolitres to the rest of the world in 2016. Paulaner is consumed in over 70 countries around the globe.

== Brands ==
There are 13 different beers brewed by Paulaner brewery:

- Wheat beer/Weissbier (Hefe-Weissbier Naturtrüb / Hefe-Weissbier Dunkel / Kristall / Isar Weisse (further Hefe-Weissbier Leicht) / Hefe-Weissbier Alkoholfrei / Weissbier 0,0 %)
- Munich Beers (Hell / Urtyp / Hell Alkoholfrei)
- Specialities (Oktoberfest Bier / Salvator / Zwickl / Ur-Dunkel)

Additionally, there are some mixed beer drinks such as Paulaner Natur Radler, Natur Radler Alkoholfrei, Natur Radler Grapefruit, Weissbier Zitrone and Weissbier Zitrone 0,0%.

All beers are brewed in accordance with the Bavarian purity law from 1516.

Paulaner also sells a (non-alcoholic) cola-orange soda mix drink (Spezi) under the name Paulaner Spezi in Germany and Paulaner Sunset in the US.

== Oktoberfest ==
The first beer huts appear on the "Wiesn" meadow and Paulaner soon obtains its license to serve beer. Eight years before, a major horse race had been organised here, when Ludwig I married Princess Theres of Saxony-Hildburghausen. This was the start of the largest popular festival in the world.

Paulaner serves three big tents at Oktoberfest: Armbrustschützenzelt, Käfer Wiesnschänke and Paulaner Festzelt. The last one is the official Paulaner brewery tent. In 2010, they rebuilt it and added a central beer ring line that is serving all bars in the tent. There are also various smaller tents at the Wiesn which serve Paulaner beer.

A seasonal light-colored lager named Paulaner Oktoberfestbier is released during fall in the US.

In addition, Paulaner organizes Oktoberfest events all over the world.

== See also ==
- List of brewing companies in Germany
- List of oldest companies
