= German Youth Institute =

German research institute

The German Youth Institute ("Deutsches Jugendinstitut" (DJI)) is a social science institute for research and development in Germany. It works in the fields of childhood, youth and family and the related policy and practice areas. The institute was founded by resolution of the German Bundestag and has existed since 1963. It has its headquarters in Munich and a branch in the Francke Foundations in Halle.
