= Lycée Jean Renoir =

Lycée Jean Renoir may refer to:

Schools in France:

- Lycée Auguste et Jean Renoir (Cité scolaire Renoir-Californie) - Angers
- Lycée Jean-Renoir - Bondy
- Collège Jean-Renoir - Boulogne-Billancourt

Schools outside France:

- Lycée Jean Renoir in Munich, Germany
