= Japanische Internationale Schule München =

- ミュンヘン日本人国際学校

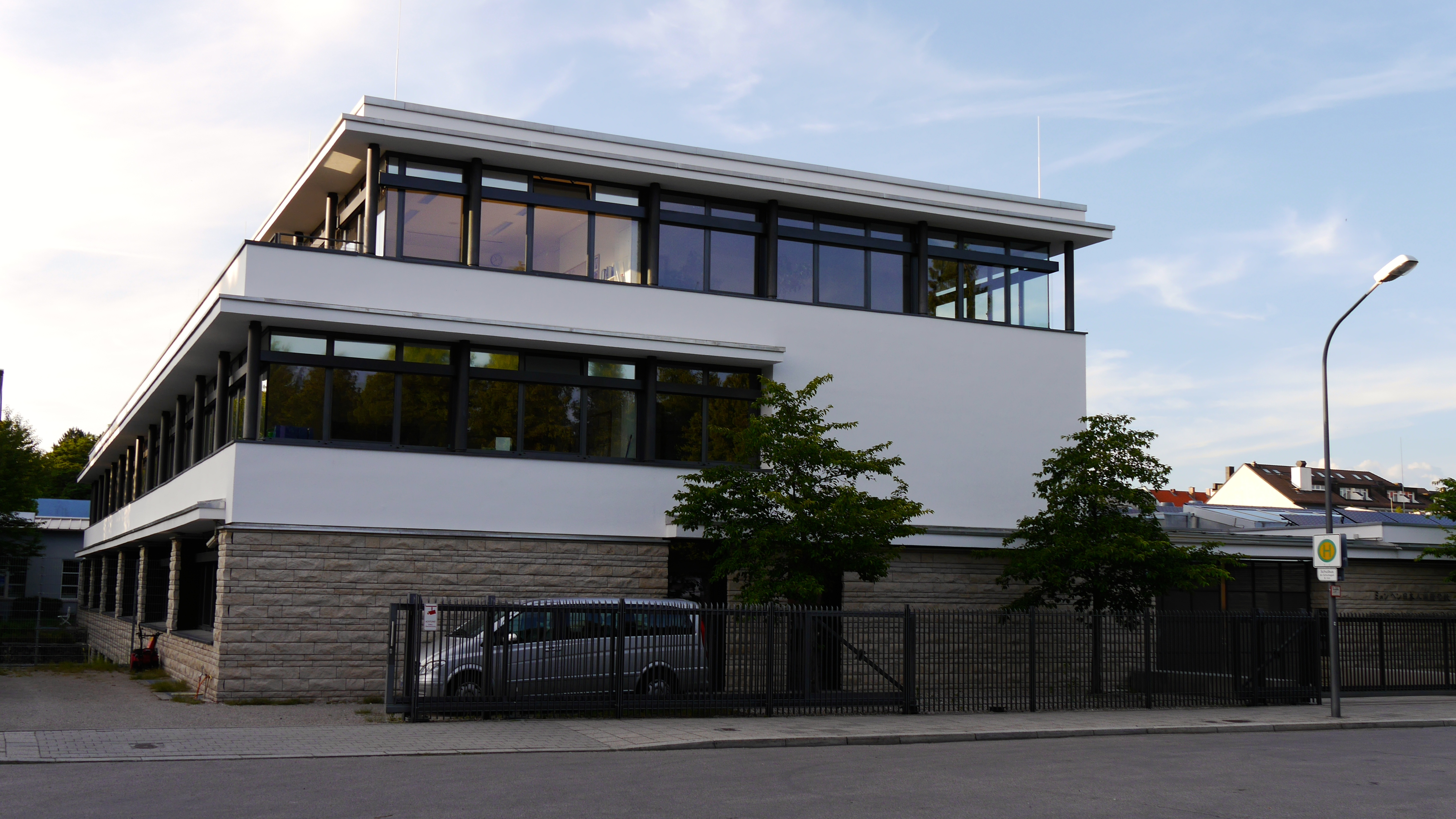

Location
- Bleyerstraße 4, 81371 Munich; Munich; Germany; 48.1108971°N 11.54592290000005°E

Information
- Type: Primary & middle school
- Established: 1994; 32 years ago
- Grades: 1-9
- Website: jis-muenchen.blogspot.com

Japanische Internationale Schule München e.V. (ミュンヘン日本人国際学校, Myunhen Nihonjin Kokusai Gakkō; JISM, English: Japanese International School Munich) is a Japanese international school in Sendling, Munich, Germany. It serves both elementary and junior high school levels.

The Japanclub München and representatives of Japanese companies founded the school. In 1994 the school first opened in a converted gymnasium on Kistlerhofstraße. At the time of opening the school had 20 students. As of 2001 the school had 120 students. That year, the school's current four story concrete campus, on a 4,100-square-metre (44,000 sq ft) plot on Bleyerstraße, opened. Its cost was 14.5 million marks.

Prospective students need to know Japanese in order to attend the school. The school does not hold classes on German public holidays.

The Japanisches Institut in München e.V. (JIM; ミュンヘン日本語補習授業校 Myunhen Nihongo Hoshū Jugyō Kō), Munich's Japanese supplementary school, holds some of its classes in the Munich Japanese school building when it is unable to hold classes at the usual location, the Mathilde-Eller Schule.

== See also ==
- Japanese people in Germany
- German international schools in Japan:
  - German School Tokyo Yokohama - in Yokohama, Japan
  - Deutsche Schule Kobe/European School
