= Alte Utting =

Bar, nightclub and music venue in Munich, Germany

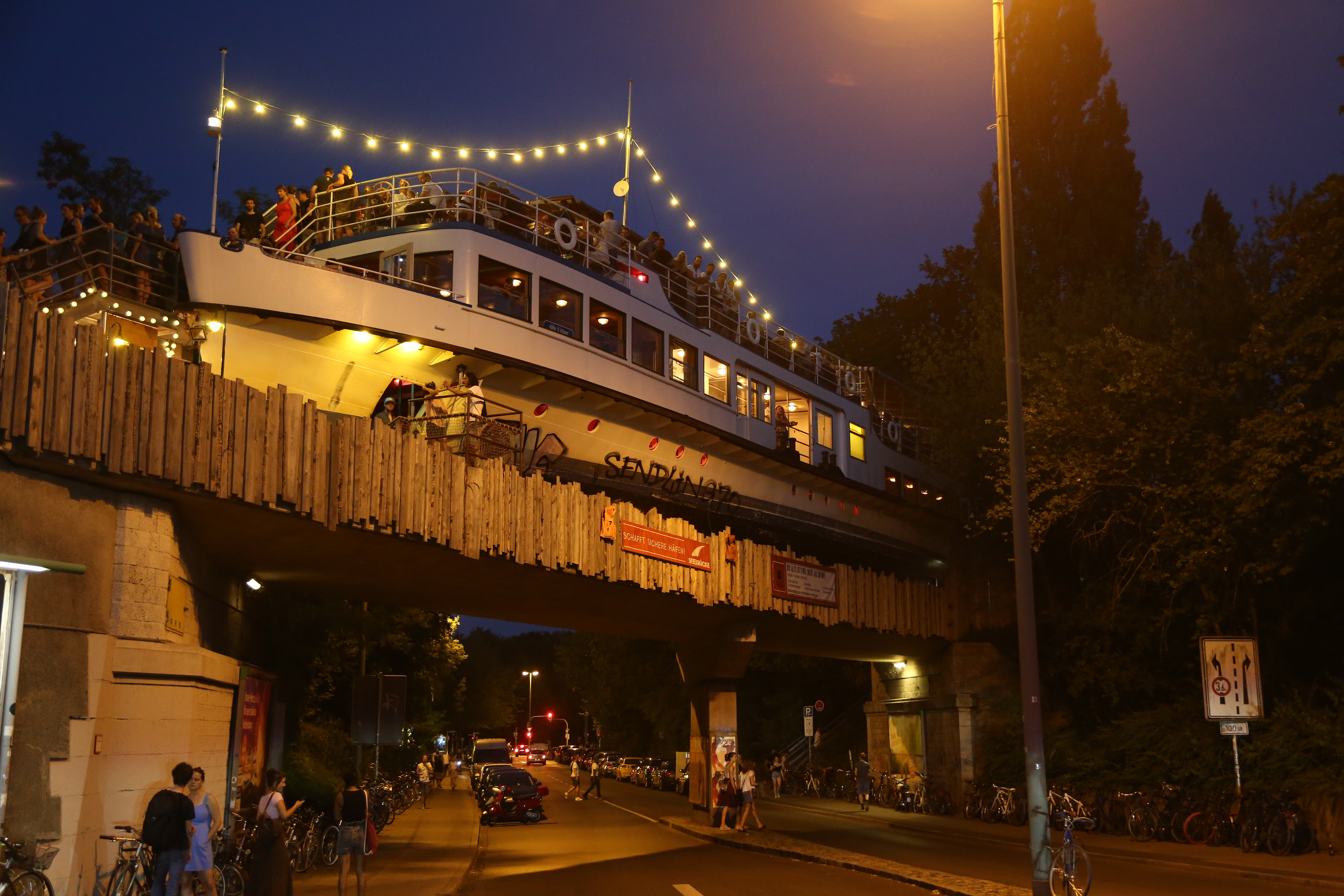
- The Alte Utting in 2018
- Interactive map of Alte Utting
- Address: Lagerhausstraße 15, 81371 Munich
- Location: Sendling, Munich, Germany
- Coordinates: 48°7′11.9″N 11°33′22.6″E
- Operator: Kulturverein Wannda e.V.
- Type: Bar, nightclub, music venue

Construction
- Built: 1949
- Opened: 2018
- Renovated: 2017–2018

Website
- Official Website

The Alte Utting is a bar, nightclub and music venue in Munich. The decommissioned, land-bound passenger ship is placed on a railway bridge that crosses an inner-city arterial road, and is regarded as one of the most spectacular nightlife spots of the city.

== History and description ==
=== Use as a passenger ship (1950–2016) ===
The ship, which has a length of 36.4 metres (119 ft 5 in), a width of 7.5 metres (24 ft 7 in) and a capacity of 400 passengers, was built by the Deggendorfer Werft und Eisenbau Gesellschaft in 1949 and she was used as a passenger ship MS Utting on the Ammersee lake in Upper Bavaria from 1950 to 2016.

=== Use as a nightlife spot (since 2018) ===
The ship was decommissioned in 2016 and then bought by the Kulturverein Wannda e.V. in Munich, which by then already had made a name for itself with other subcultural projects such as the nightclub Bahnwärter Thiel or the permanent festival Wannda Circus, and which was able to finance the project from the revenues of these event locations. On 21 and 22 February 2017 the hull of the ship and the superstructures were transported from the Ammersee lake to Munich. For the night-time transport to Munich, the Autobahn had to be closed by the police. After its arrival in Munich, the 144-ton ship was deployed on a former railway bridge close to the Wholesale Market Munich that crosses an inner-city arterial road, and the conversion to a nightlife and cultural venue started. Due to tremendous static and safety-relevant requirements the opening of the venue was delayed for more than one year. On 12 July 2018 the former ship was christened to the name Alte Utting on the railway bridge by the head of the municipal planning and building control office Julia Schönfeld-Knor. After completion of the reconstruction measures, the party ship has been open daily since 26 July 2018 and is primarily used as a bar, restaurant, discothèque (in the engine room), music venue and cabaret stage. As the Alte Utting quickly established itself as an attraction that is known far beyond the city borders, local politicians plan to preserve it permanently.

== Reception ==
The Alte Utting and its cultural events regularly receive media attention by local, nationwide and international media. The New York Times described the Alte Utting as an example of hip night life spots in Munich "that could give Berlin a run for its money". According to the Süddeutsche Zeitung, the Alte Utting has become "a kind of landmark" of the city of Munich.

== Gallery ==
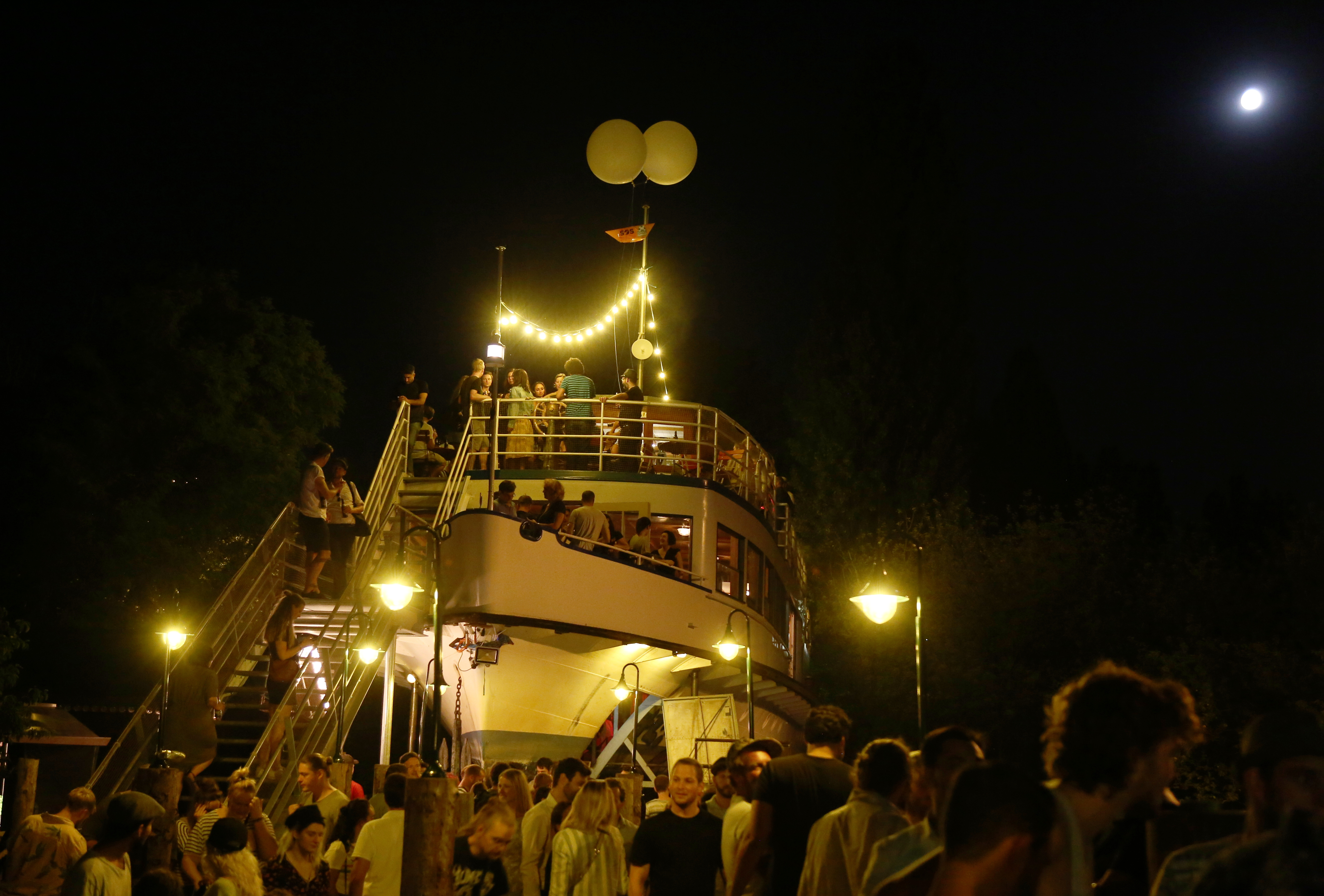
The Alte Utting on the opening night (26 July 2018)

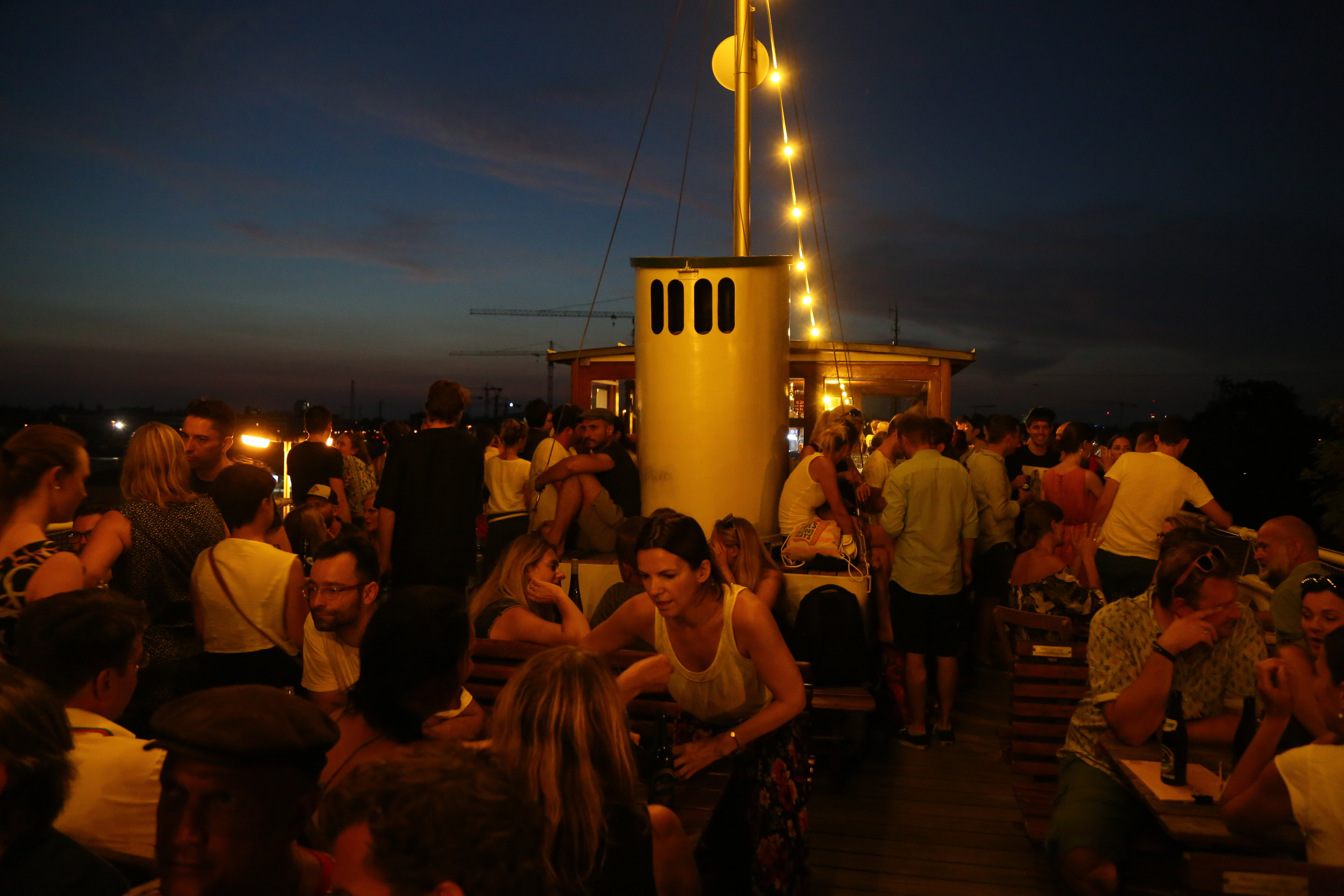
Party guests on the upper deck having a view over nightly Sendling

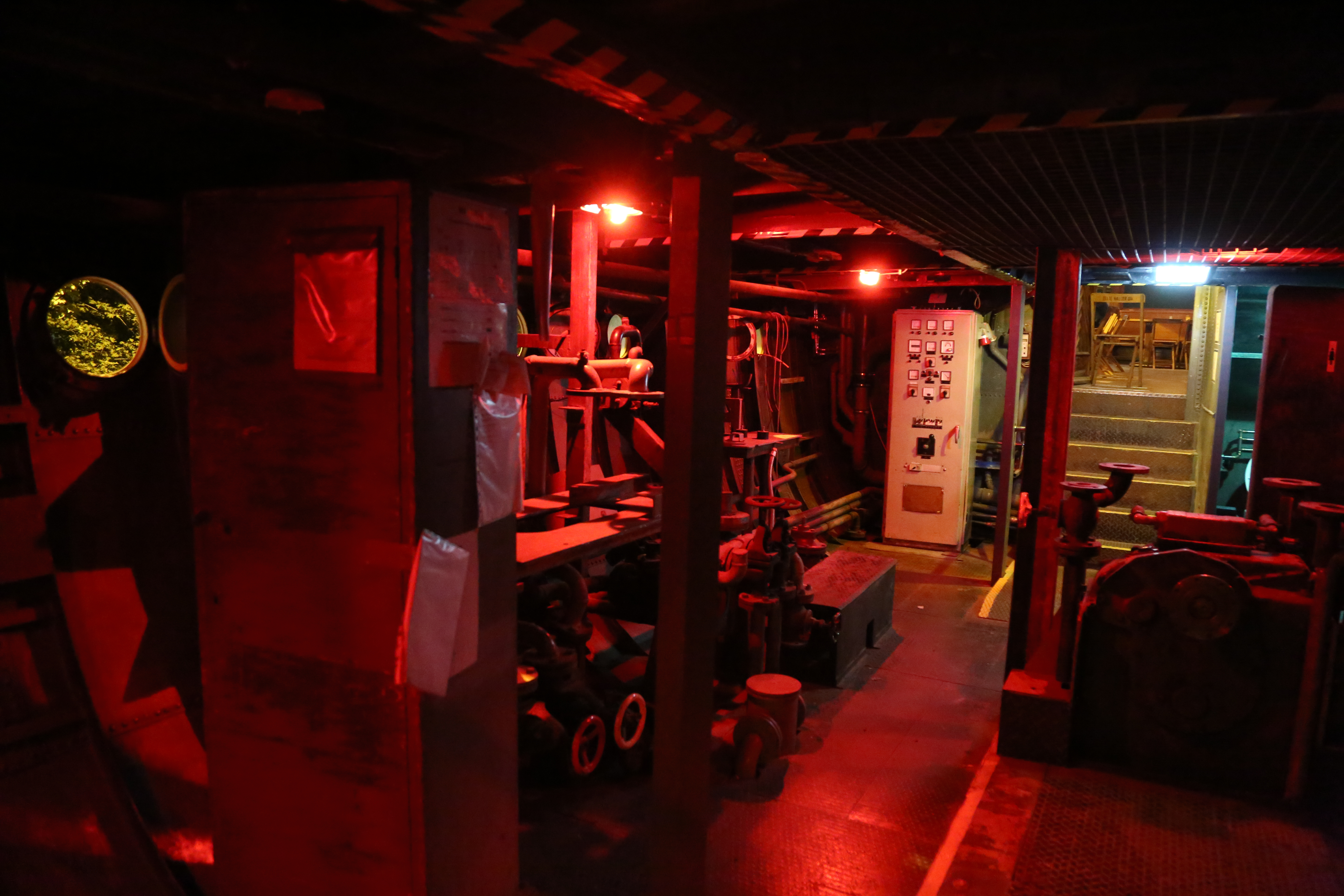
The enginge room of the Alte Utting is used as a discothèque

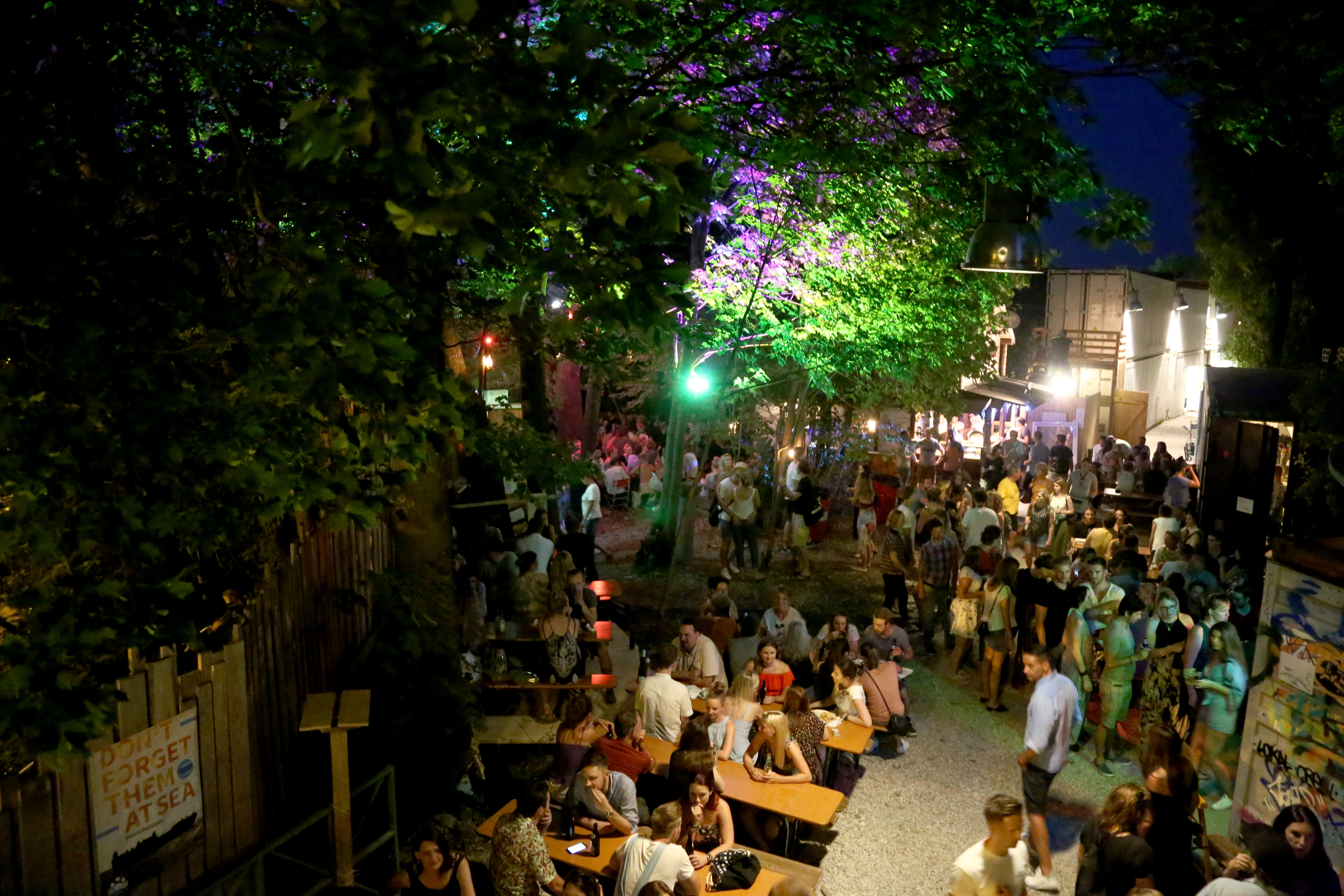
Beer garden behind the stern of the ship

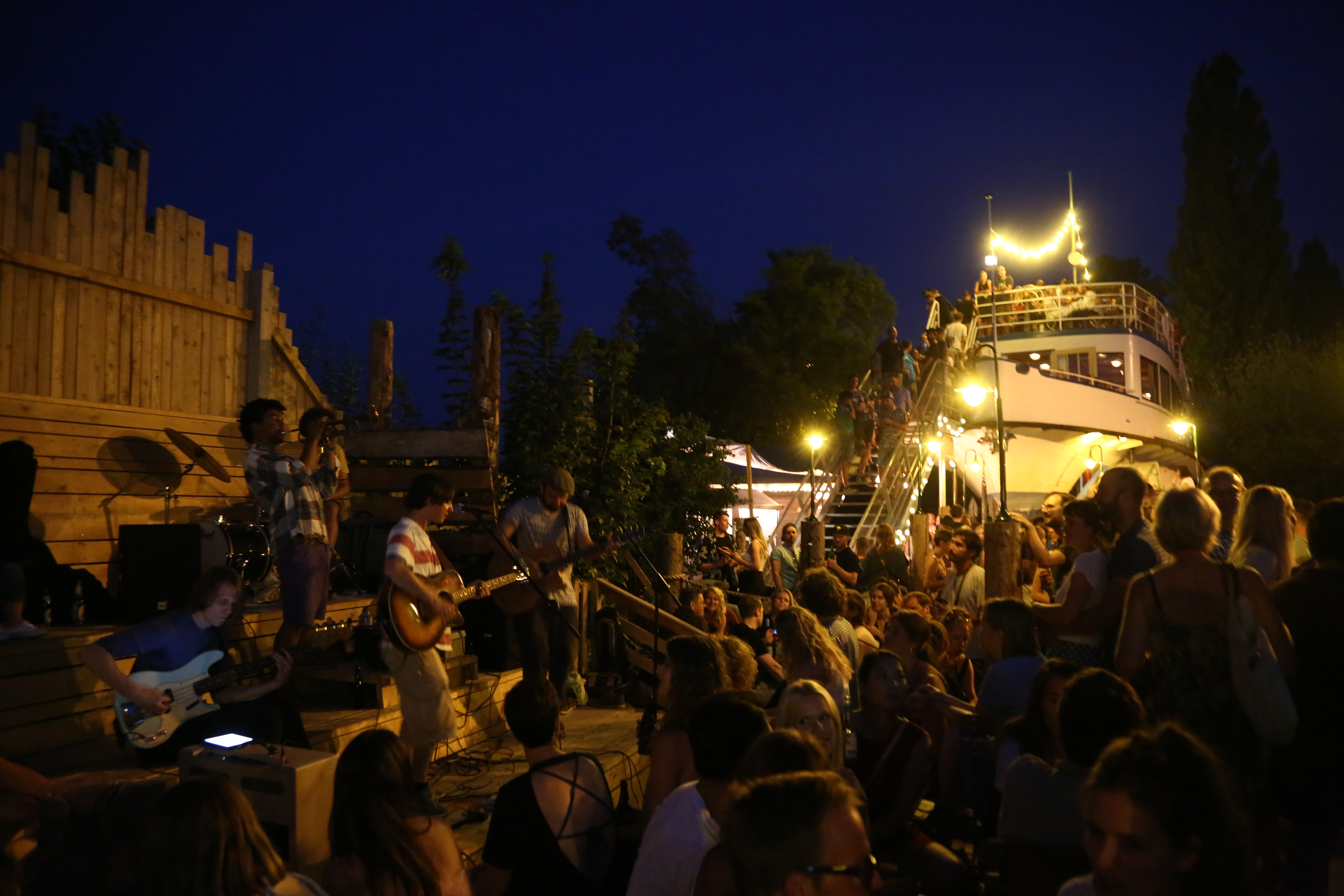
Live concert in front of the bow of the ship
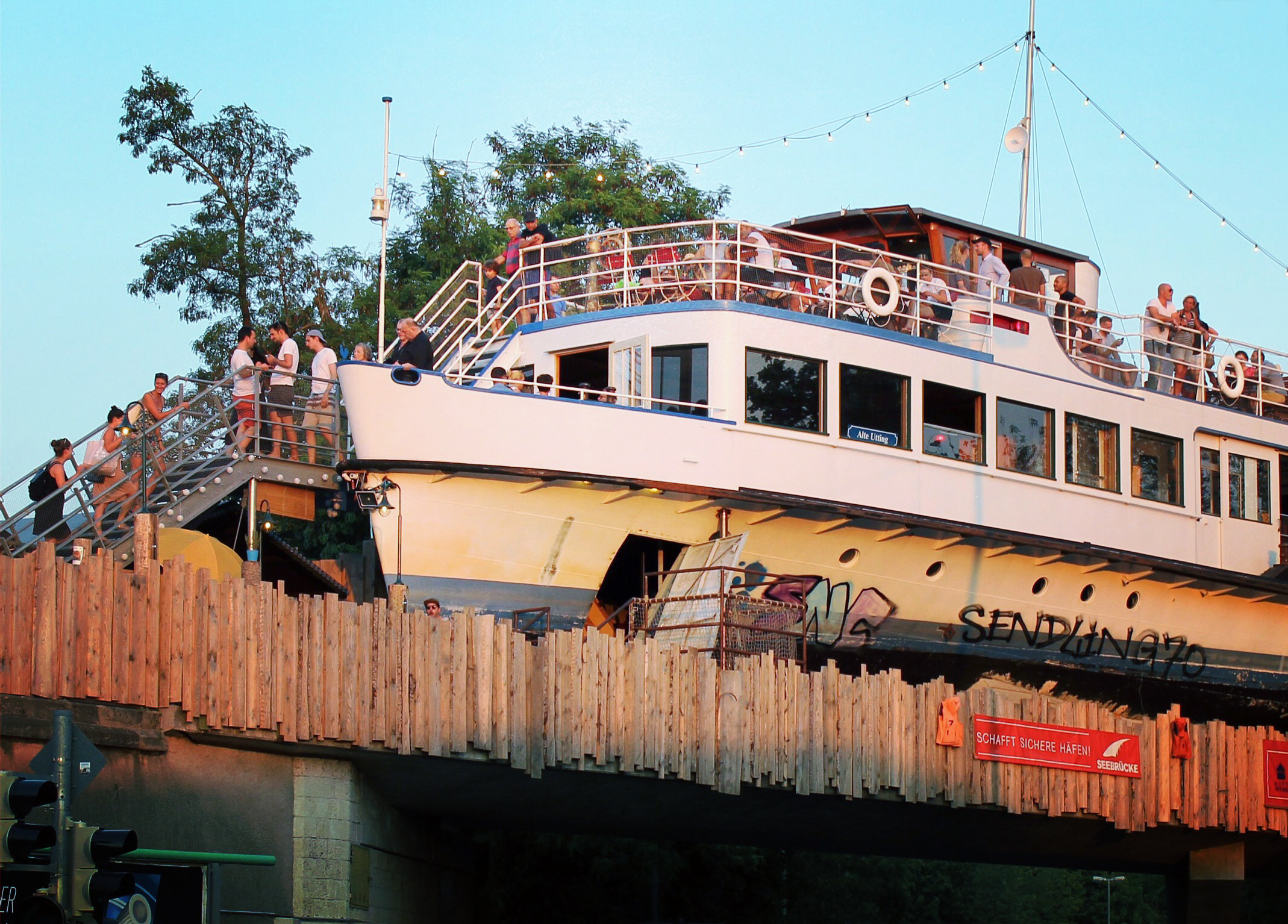
Party guests on the Alte Utting (2018)

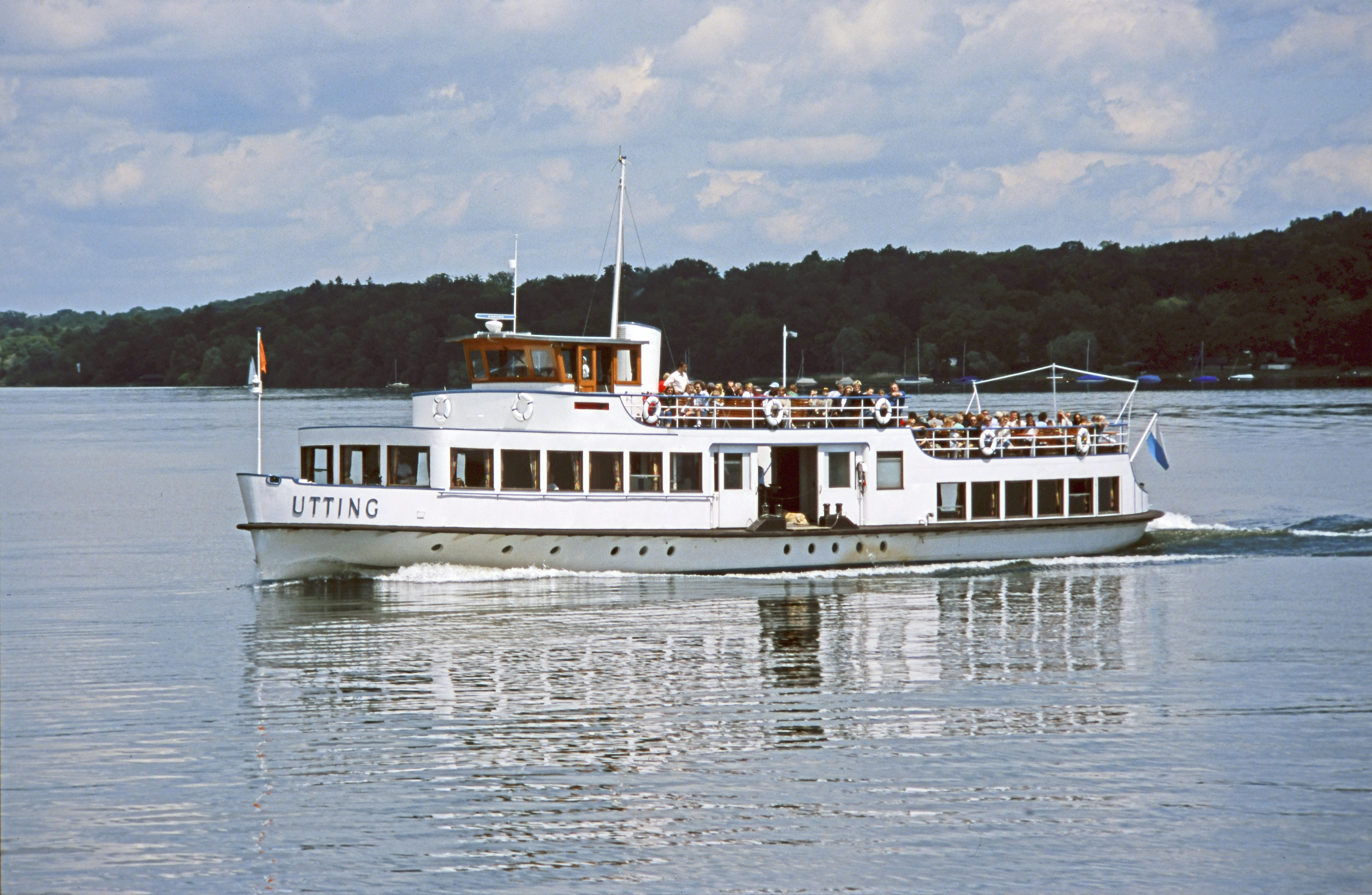
The MS Utting as passenger ship on the Ammersee lake (1991)

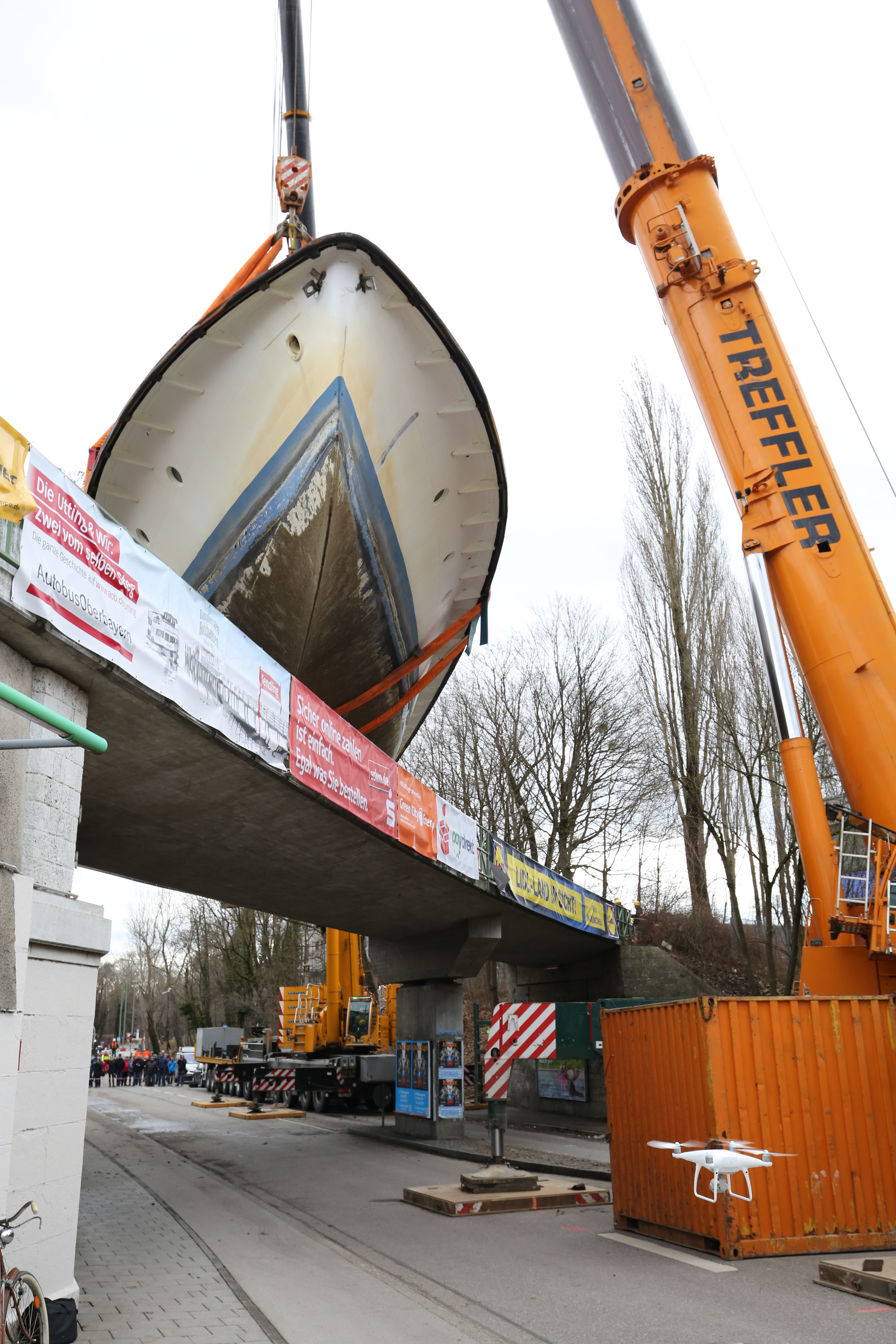
The lifting of the Utting (Febr. 2017)

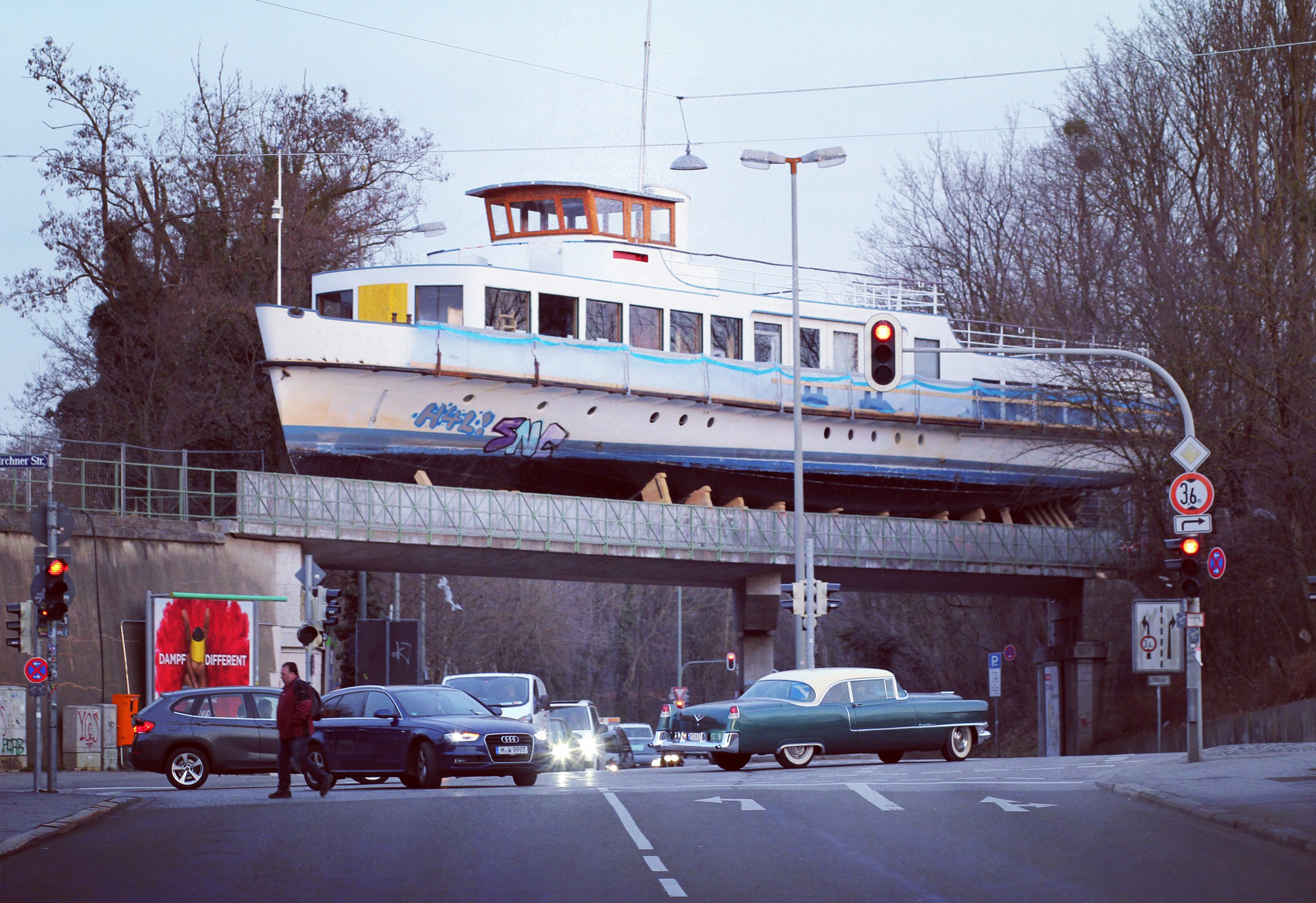
The MS Utting during its conversion (March 2017)
