= Sendling =

Borough of Munich, Germany

Coordinates: 48°07′17″N 11°32′29″E

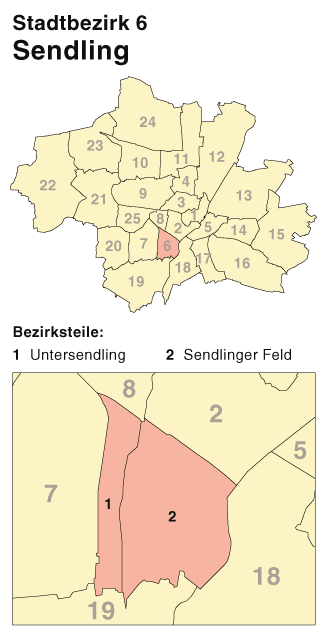
Borough 6 - Sendling: location in Munich

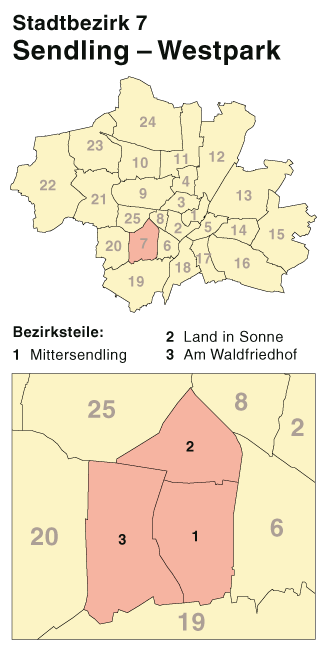
Borough 7 - Sendling-Westpark: location in Munich

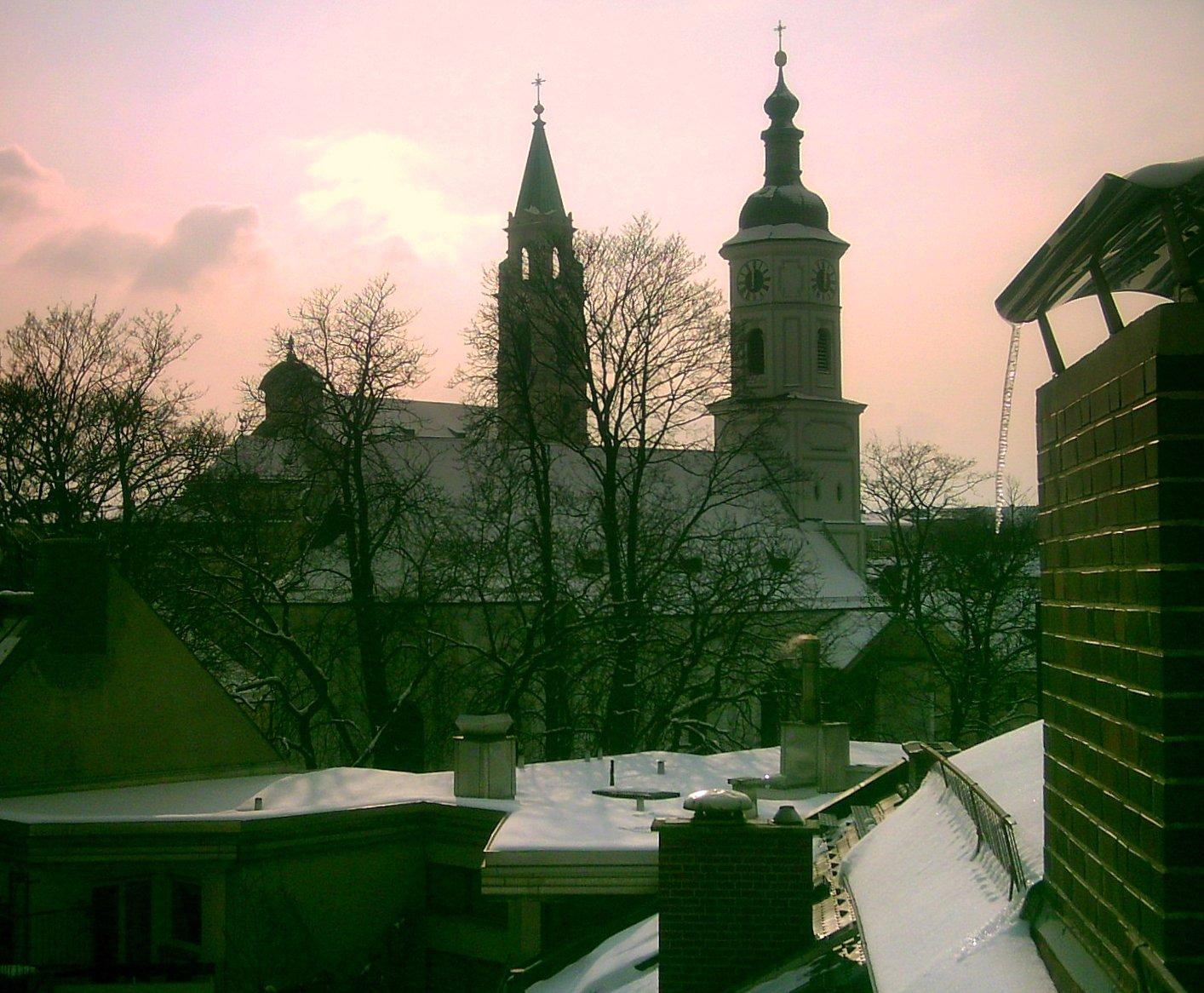
The spires of Old and New St. Margaret's Church are important landmarks of Sendling.

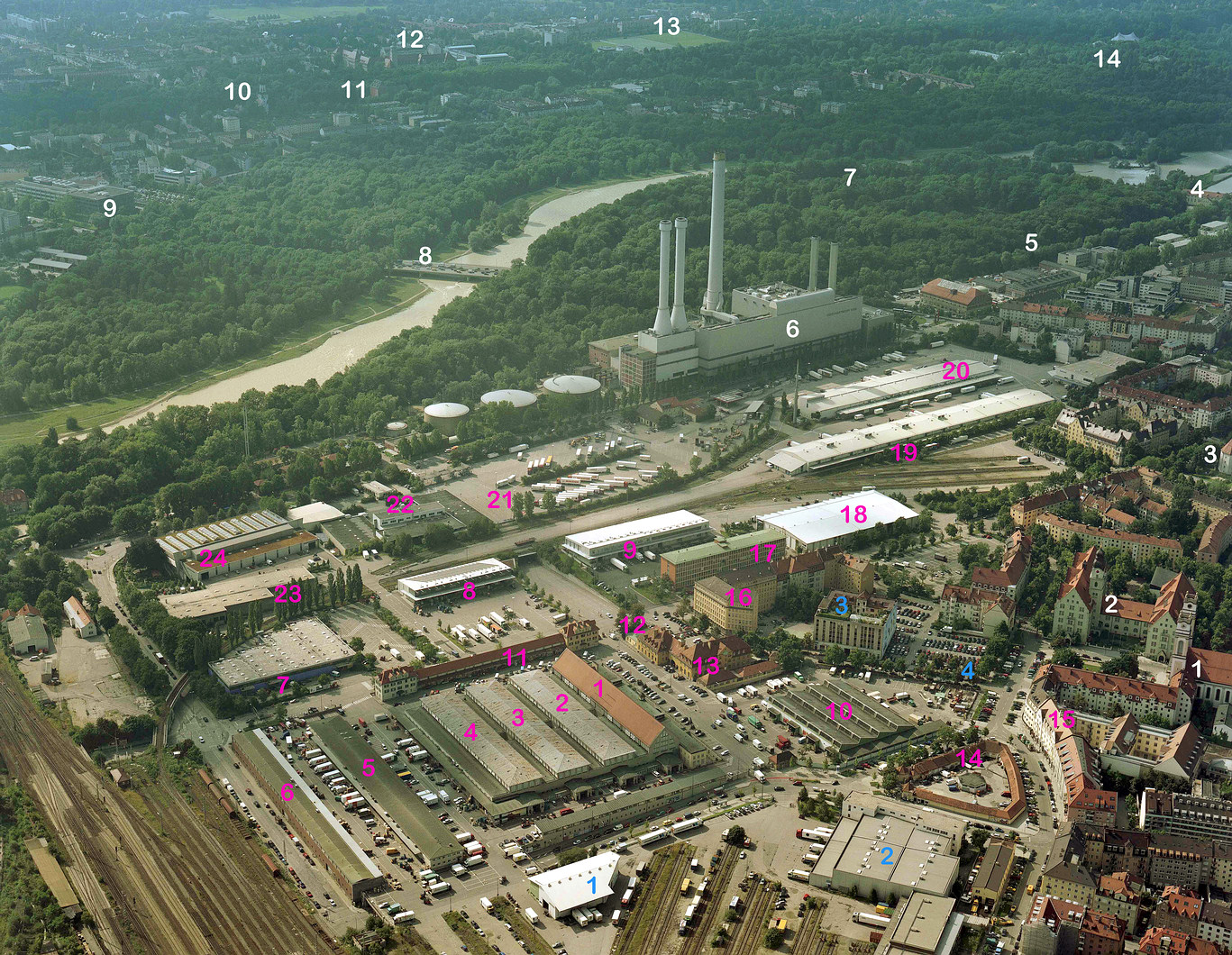
Aerial view of the Market Hall area (view to the east). A legend is available on the picture's page.

Sendling (German pronunciation: [ˈzɛntlɪŋ]) is a borough of Munich. It is located south-west of the city centre and spans the city boroughs Sendling and Sendling-Westpark. Sendling is subdivided into Obersendling, Mittersendling, and Untersendling. Untersendling and Mittersendling are located in the borough of Sendling, and Obersendling is located in the borough of Thalkirchen-Obersendling-Forstenried-Fürstenried-Solln.

== Overview ==
Sendling is mainly a residential quarter, with shops and businesses straddling the Plinganserstraße around the historical core of Sendling. It is a multicultural quarter, with one of the largest rates of foreigners among the population. The proposed site for the new mosque in Sendling is located at Gotzinger Platz, opposite St. Korbinian Church. Supposedly, this neighborhood boasts the best falafels in town, located in the Valleystrasse.

Harras, an urban square near the historical centre of Sendling, is the busiest square of the borough. A number of shops and businesses line the square; Plinganserstraße, an important traffic artery running from north to south, skirts Harras in the east. A railway station, Harras Station, is located nearby, serviced by U-Bahn metro and S-Bahn suburban trains. Harras is the business point in Munich-South. There are many shops, working places and two of the biggest schools in Munich: Dante-Gymnasium and Klenze-Gymnasium.

The Westpark is a large recreational park located in the west of the borough. It was laid out for the International Gardening Exhibition that took place in Munich in 1983. Munich's main traffic artery, the Mittlerer Ring, cuts right through the park and divides it into an eastern and a western park.

Sendling is served by the U-Bahn metro lines 3 and 6 as well as the S-Bahn suburban trains 7, 20 and 27. Harras Station is served by some regional train services, as well.

The Wholesale Market Munich, in the eastern part of the borough, is Europe's third-largest grocery market as well as the borough's largest single employer.

In the very northeast of Sendling the Alte Utting is located, a nightlife spot and attraction that became known far beyond Munich's city borders.

== Sendling's Night of Murder ==
Historically, Sendling is known for the Sendlinger Mordweihnacht ("Sendling's Night of Murder"), a massacre of rebelling peasants which took place there in 1705.

== Education ==
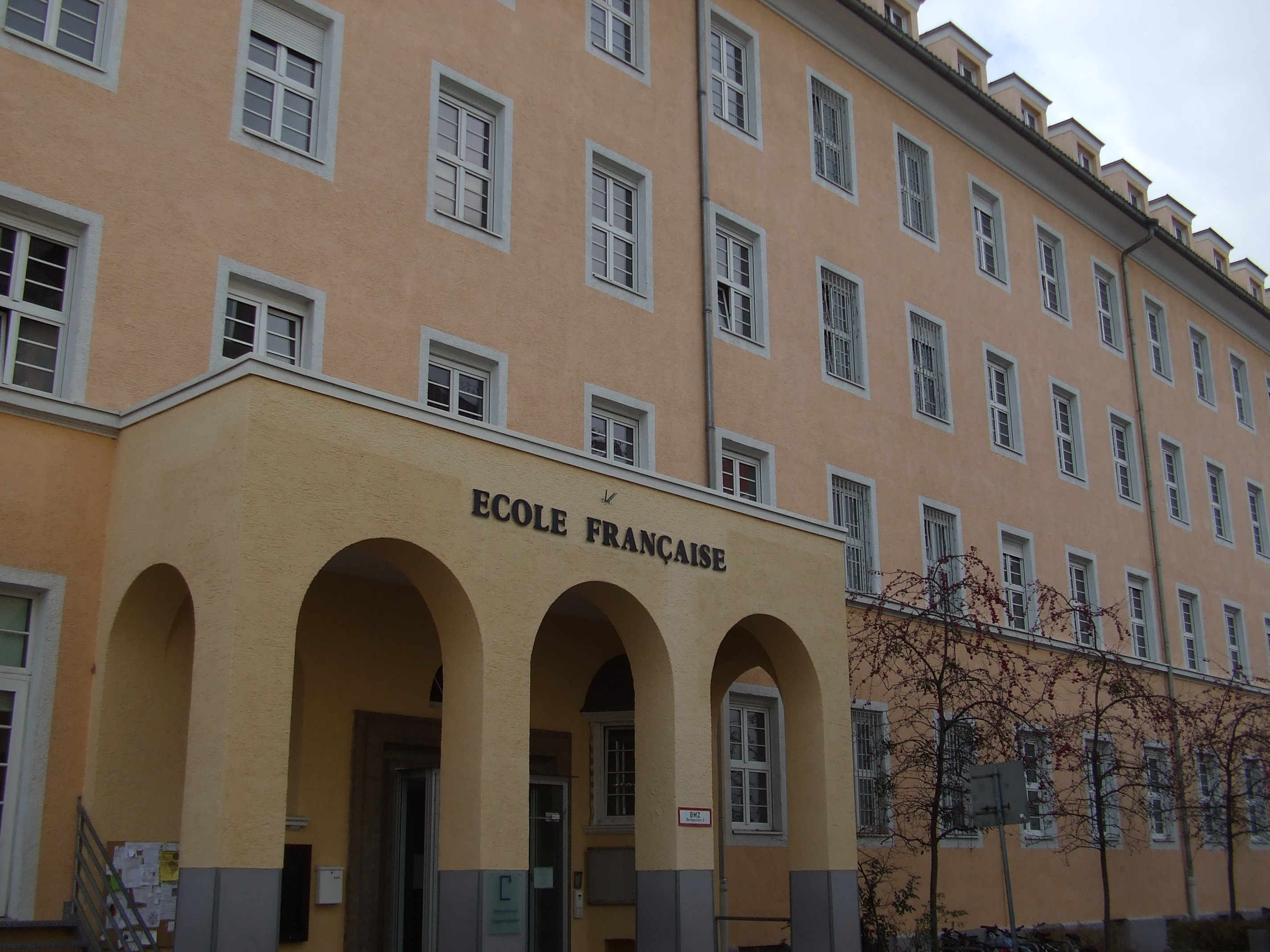
Secondary campus of the Lycée Jean Renoir

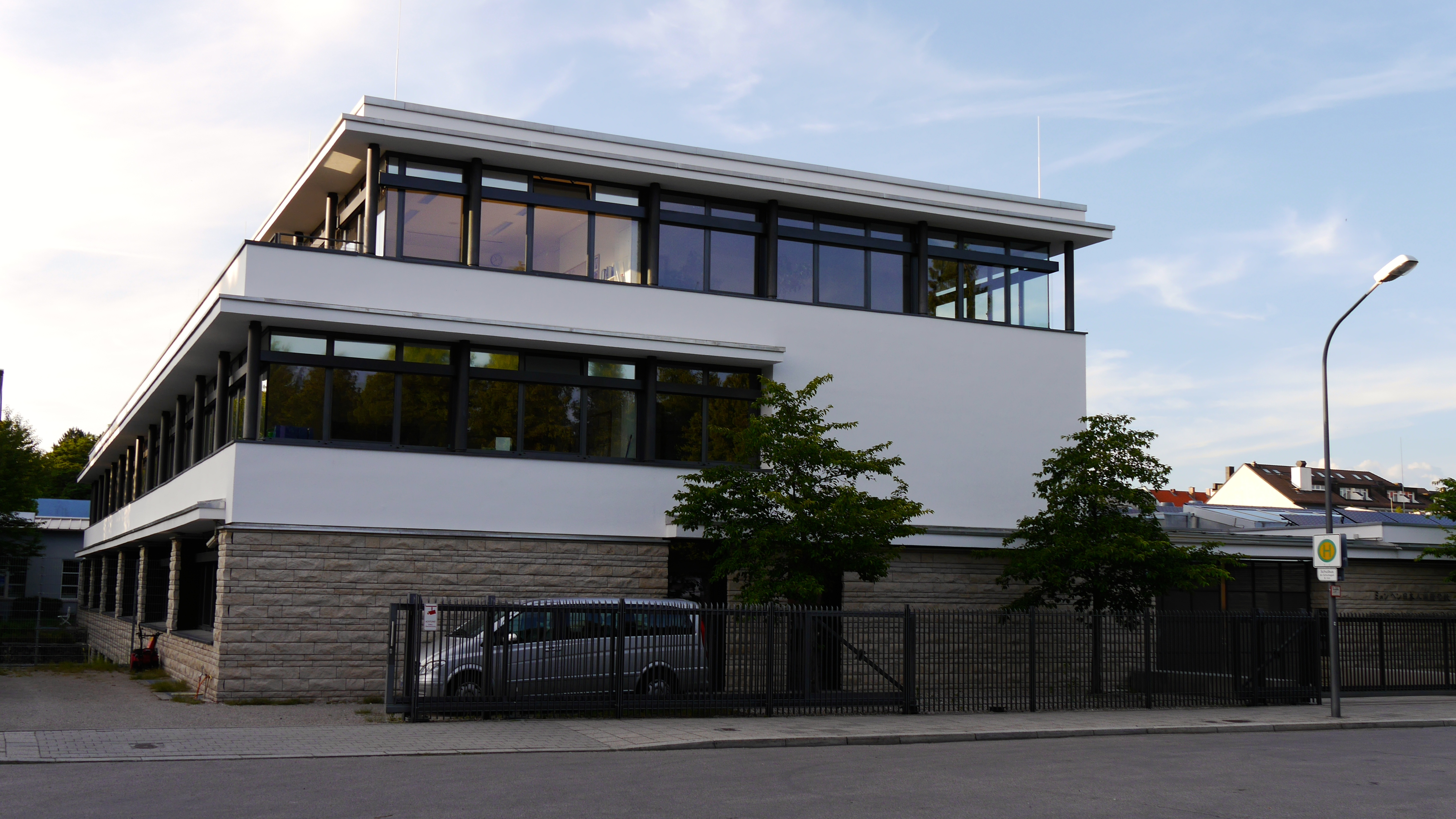
Japanische Internationale Schule München

The Lycée Jean Renoir, a French international school, maintains its secondary school campus in Sendling.

The Japanische Internationale Schule München, a Japanese international school, is located in Sendling.
