= Bahnwärter Thiel (club) =

Cultural center and music venue in Munich, Germany

Coordinates: 48.122104°N 11.55478°E

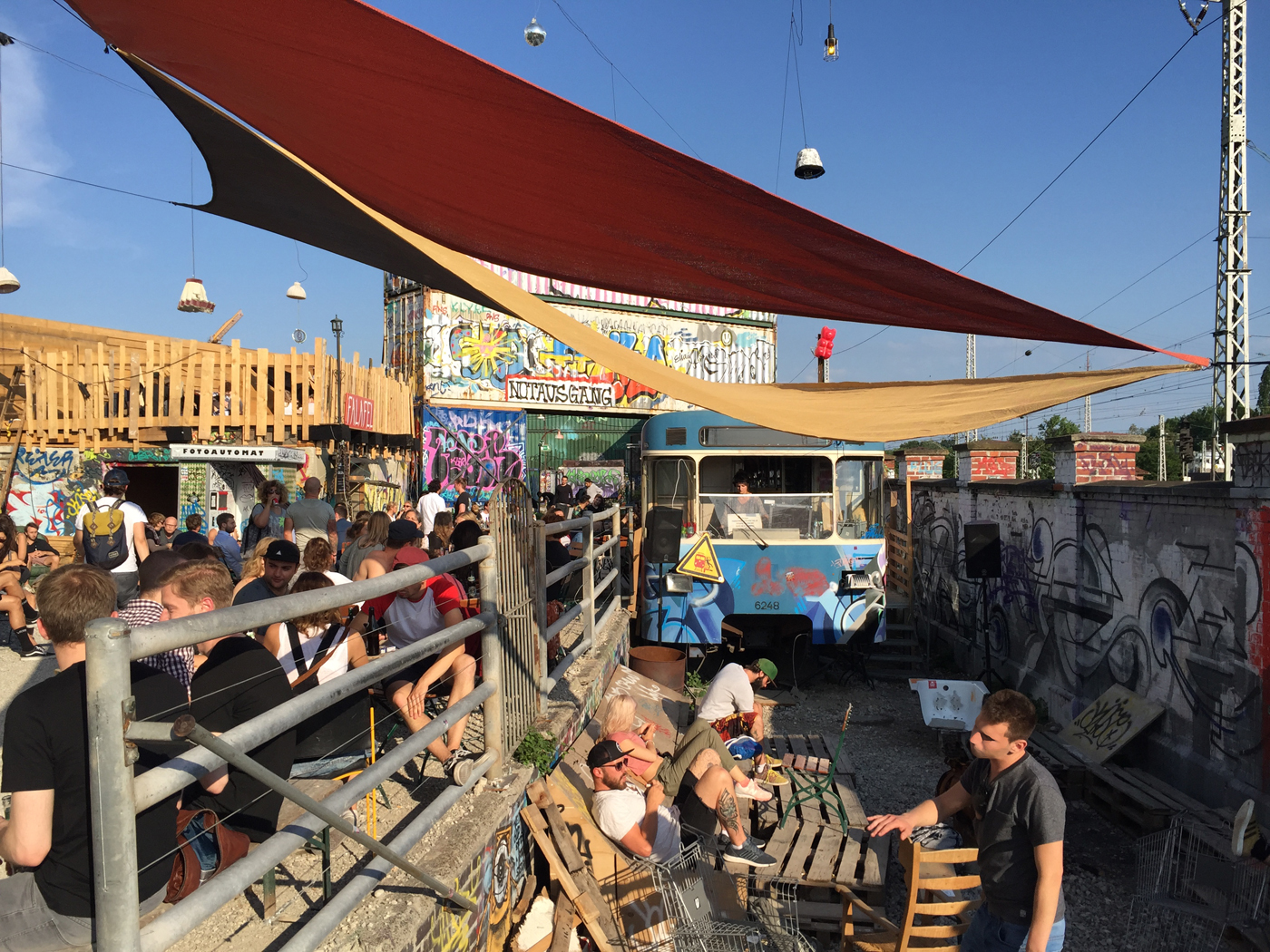
- The outdoor area of the club, with DJ booth in the subway car driver's cabin, in May 2018
- Interactive map of Bahnwärter Thiel
- Address: Tumblinger Straße 29
- Location: Munich, Germany
- Operator: Bahnwärter-Kulturstätten
- Type: Nightclub and cultural center

Construction
- Opened: November 2015

Website
- bahnwaerterthiel.de

The Bahnwärter Thiel is a techno club, music venue and alternative cultural center in Schlachthofviertel, Ludwigsvorstadt-Isarvorstadt, Munich, Germany. It is named after the novella "Bahnwärter Thiel" by German author Gerhart Hauptmann.

== Description ==
The venue consists of repurposed intermodal containers, a temporary pavilion formerly used by the Lenbachhaus, as well as decommissioned subway cars. It hosts club nights and outdoor raves, lectures, exhibitions, improvisational theatre, concerts, and flea markets.

It has also been commented that "...artists of all disciplines..." use the "...studios, rehearsal spaces, open workspaces, and workshops." at the Bahnwärter Thiel.

== History ==
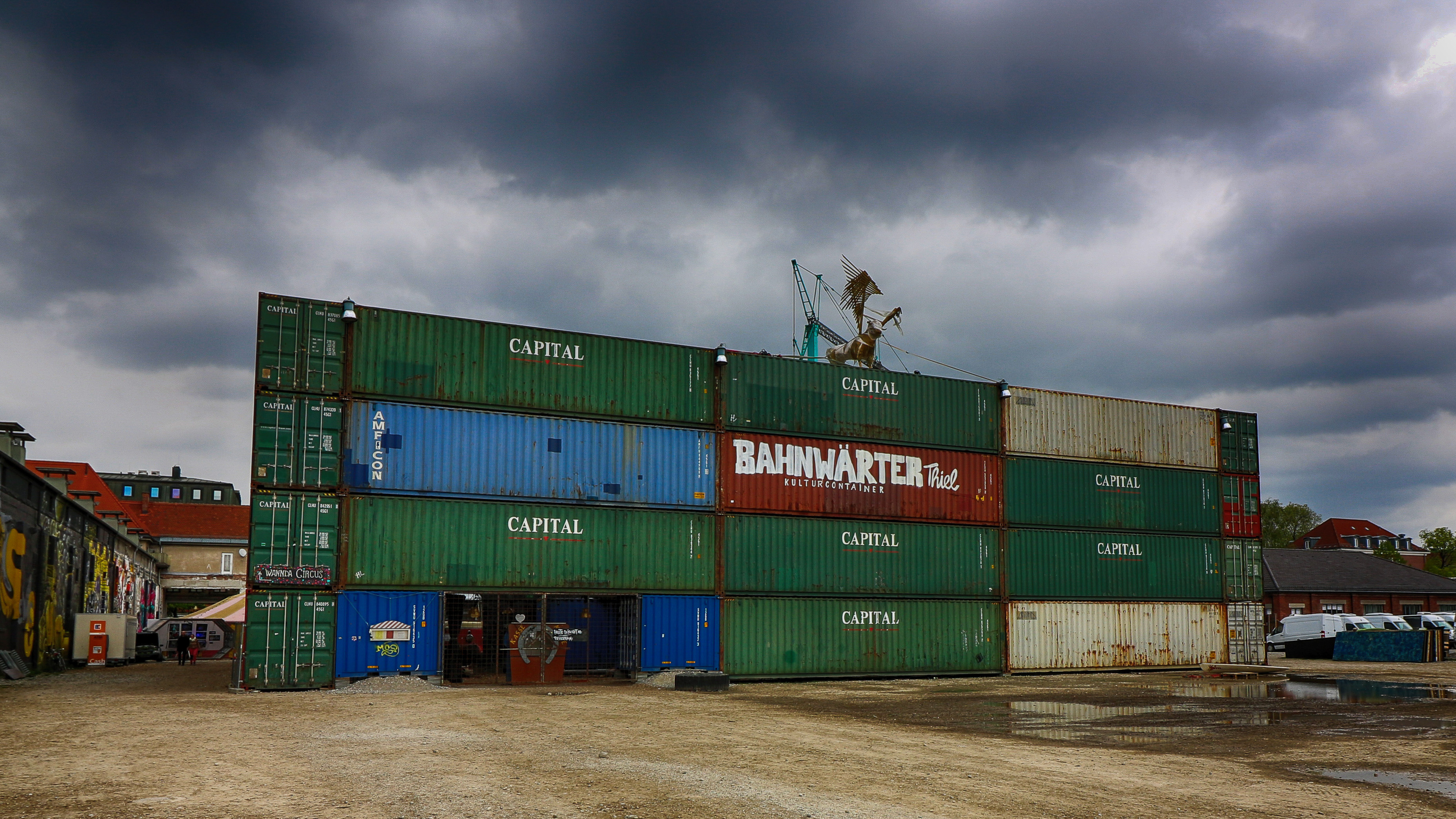
The nightclub at the Bahnwärter Thiel is made of repurposed intermodal shipping containers. It is located at the Viehhof or Slaughterhouse. 2017

The Bahnwärter Thiel has spaces that both street artists and graffiti artists are able to use such as studios, rehearsal spaces, open workspaces, and workshops. 2024

=== Origins and first sites ===
Daniel Hahn founded Bahnwärter-Kulturstätten in 2015, and Bahnwärter Thiel opened in the same year. The concept featured a withdrawn MAN MAN-Schienenbus railbus, repurposed as a culture venue on the grounds of the former "Viehhof" (Slaughterhouse) in Munich.

The railbus was first used as part of the alternative christmas market "Märchenbazar" in November 2015.

In May 2016, the railbus was moved to the grounds of the University of Television and Film Munich for summer 2016. It was moved back to the Viehhof area in October, where a 40 m (130 ft) wide and 10 m (33 ft) high structure of 54 shipping containers was built for sound- and weatherproofing. In May 2017, the railbus once again was moved to the University of Television and Film, this time being rebranded as "Minna Thiel", named after the wife of the protagonist of the novel "Bahnwärter Thiel" by Gerhart Hauptmann.

=== Viehbahnhof location ===
After a five-year lease-agreement was reached, the Bahnwärter Thiel venue permanently moved to the Viehhof in late 2017. The new location is on the former freight station of the Viehhof, the so-called Viehbahnhof, about 400 meters away from its previous location there. The concept for the new location includes ateliers, workspaces and workshops, as well as band practice rooms, part of which will be located in some of the repurposed containers. This location on the Viehhof area sparked a debate about gentrification and spaces for subculture in Munich, as parts of the local graffiti scene feared that they might lose the last space in Munich where spraying graffiti was allowed and legal. Hahn has stated that it was always intended to include graffiti on the project and also wants to integrate the scene in the decoration of the venue. A wooden wall with a length of 100 m (330 ft) was constructed as a designated space for graffiti. The construction was organized by Bahnwärter Thiel staff, parts of the graffiti scene, and the City of Munich. Artists feared that the wooden wall might be used to prevent sprayers from entering the premises. In May 2018, there was an arson attack on the venue, resulting in a wooden shed burning down.

The outside brick wall of the Viehhof or slaughterhouse on Tumblinger street has been called an important hub for street art and graffiti, since the mid-80s it has been a meeting place for artists, and since the early 90s it has become an internationally known legal hall of fame. It hosts regular spray events such as the Neujahresverchromung. It has also been commented that the Bahnwärter Thiel cultural project is a hub that connects art and culture,it has also been a meeting place for people from all over the world since 2015.

A withdrawn Munich U-Bahn car was moved to the Bahnwärter Thiel in early 2018. Two more U-Bahn cars followed in October 2018. It is planned to use one of the cars as a cafeteria, and the other as a workspace. In May 2019 an old decommissioned tram from 1967 that was found in Ulm was brought to the Bahnwärter Thiel. It is planned to use the tram as a youth center and for holding art workshops.

=== Future development ===
Before the lease for the Viehhof area ended in late 2022 it got extended until at least 2027. The redevelopment of the Viehhof has already begun, with the construction of the new Münchner Volkstheater, which is scheduled to be completed in 2021. The city of Munich also plans to build apartments on parts of the area.

== Reception ==
The New York Times cited Bahnwärter Thiel as an example of hip night life spots in Munich "that could give Berlin a run for its money". At the Munich Nightlife Awards, Bahnwärter Thiel was awarded the 3rd place in the category techno/house/electro in 2016, and the winner in the category ambience/scenery in 2017.

== Associated Projects ==
Since 2018, the Bahnwärter Thiel crew also operates the party ship Alte Utting, a former passenger ship from the Ammersee lake that is now crossing an inner-city arterial road on a railway bridge in Munich, and received a lot of media attention as well.

== Gallery ==
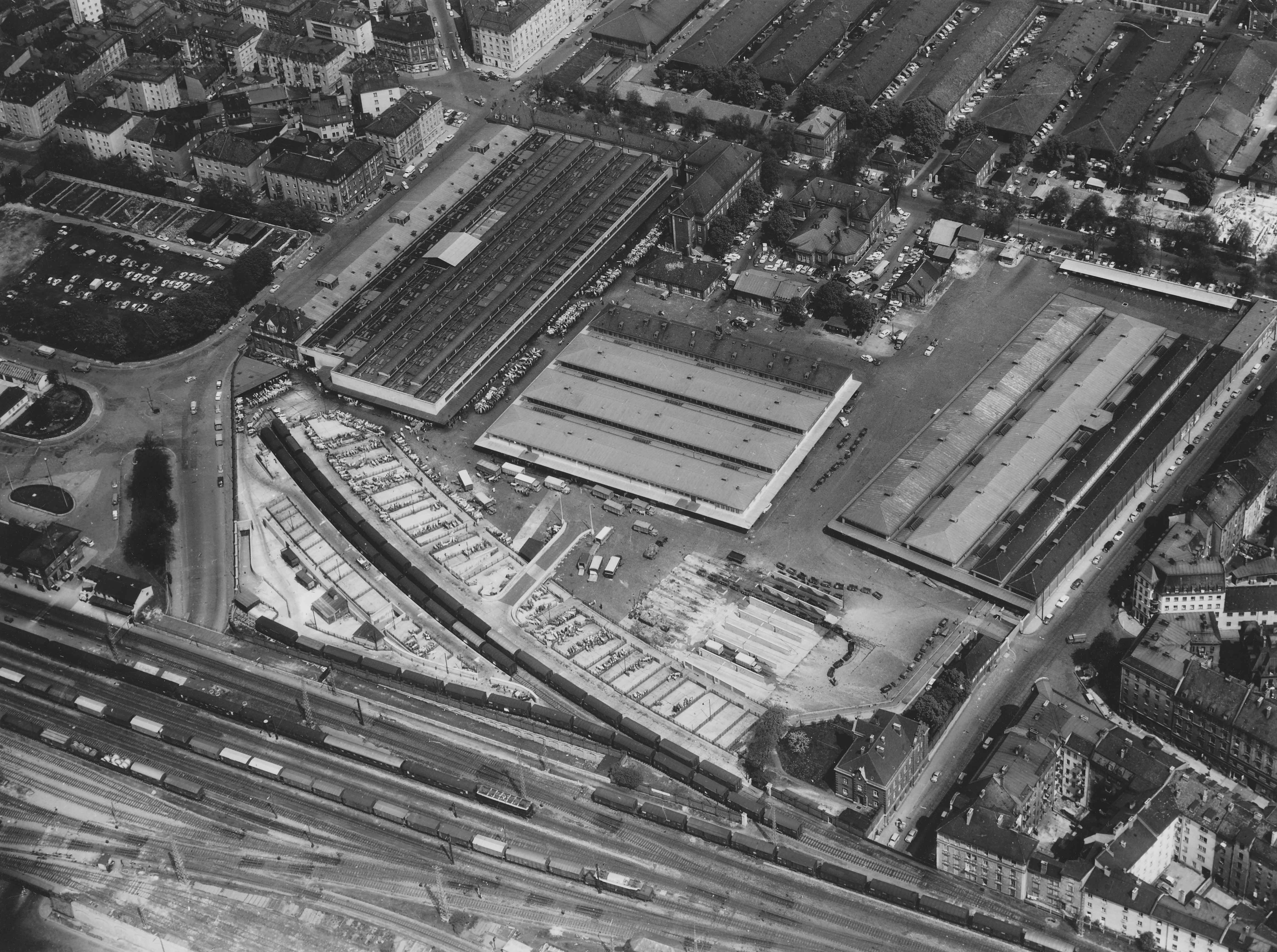
Munich slaughterhouse in 1962

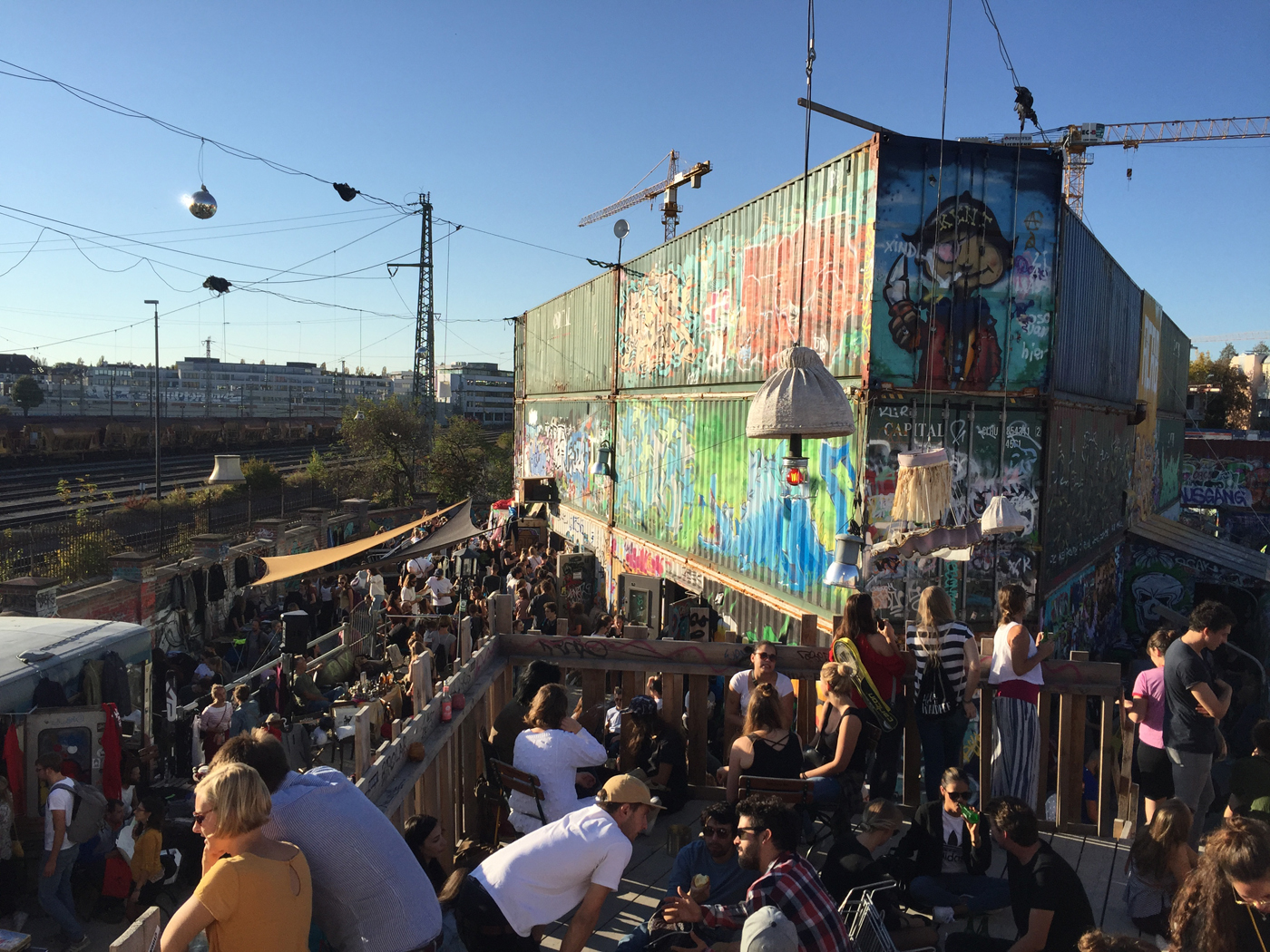
Outdoor area of Bahnwärter Thiel on a sunday afternoon. 2018

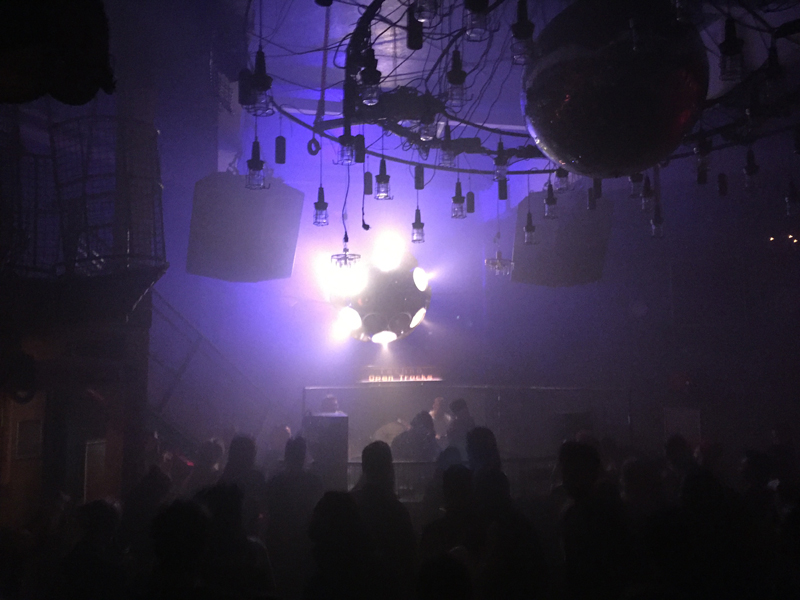
Rave on the main floor of Bahnwärter Thiel. 2020

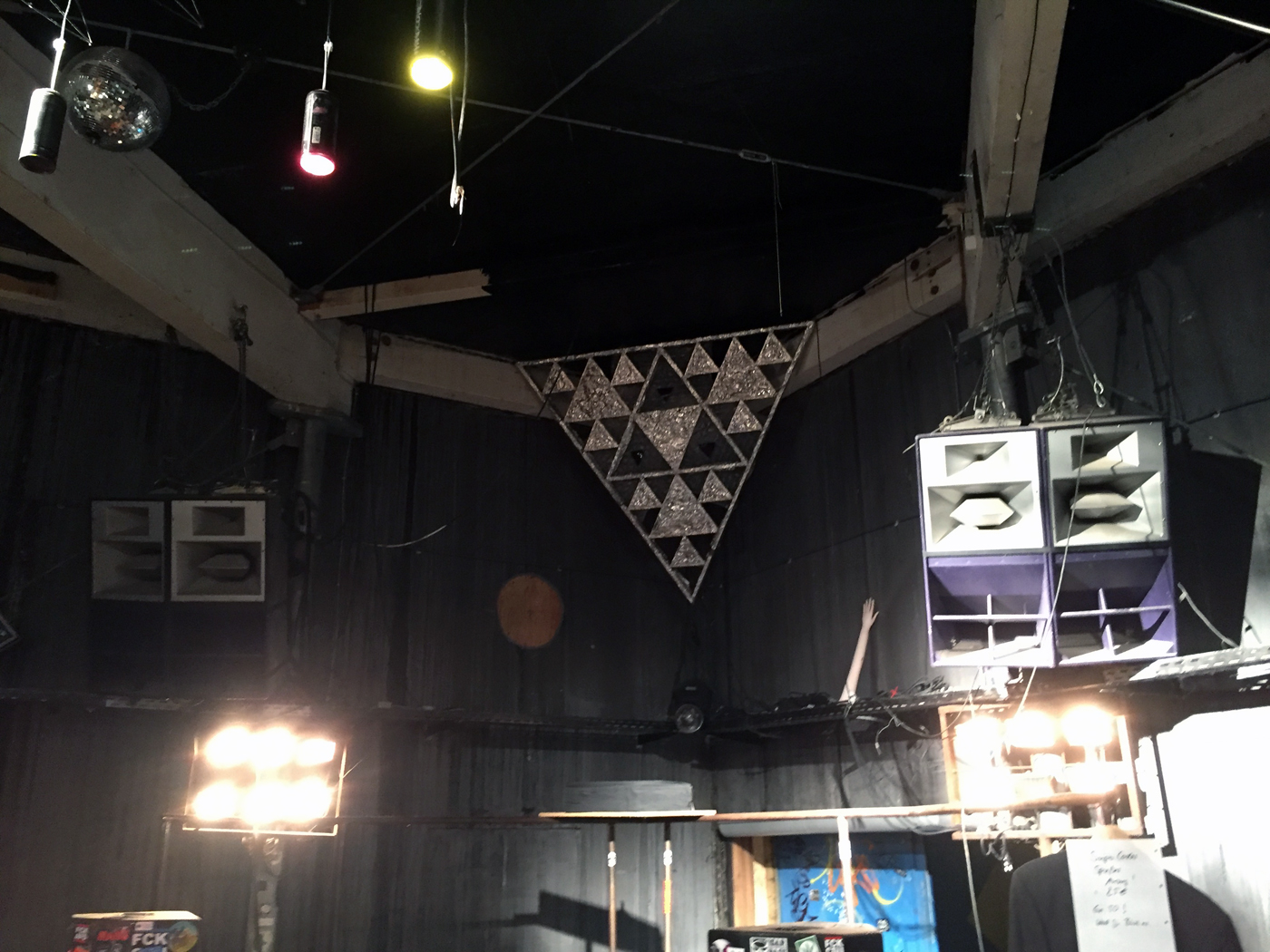
Interior view of Bahnwärter Thiel. 2018

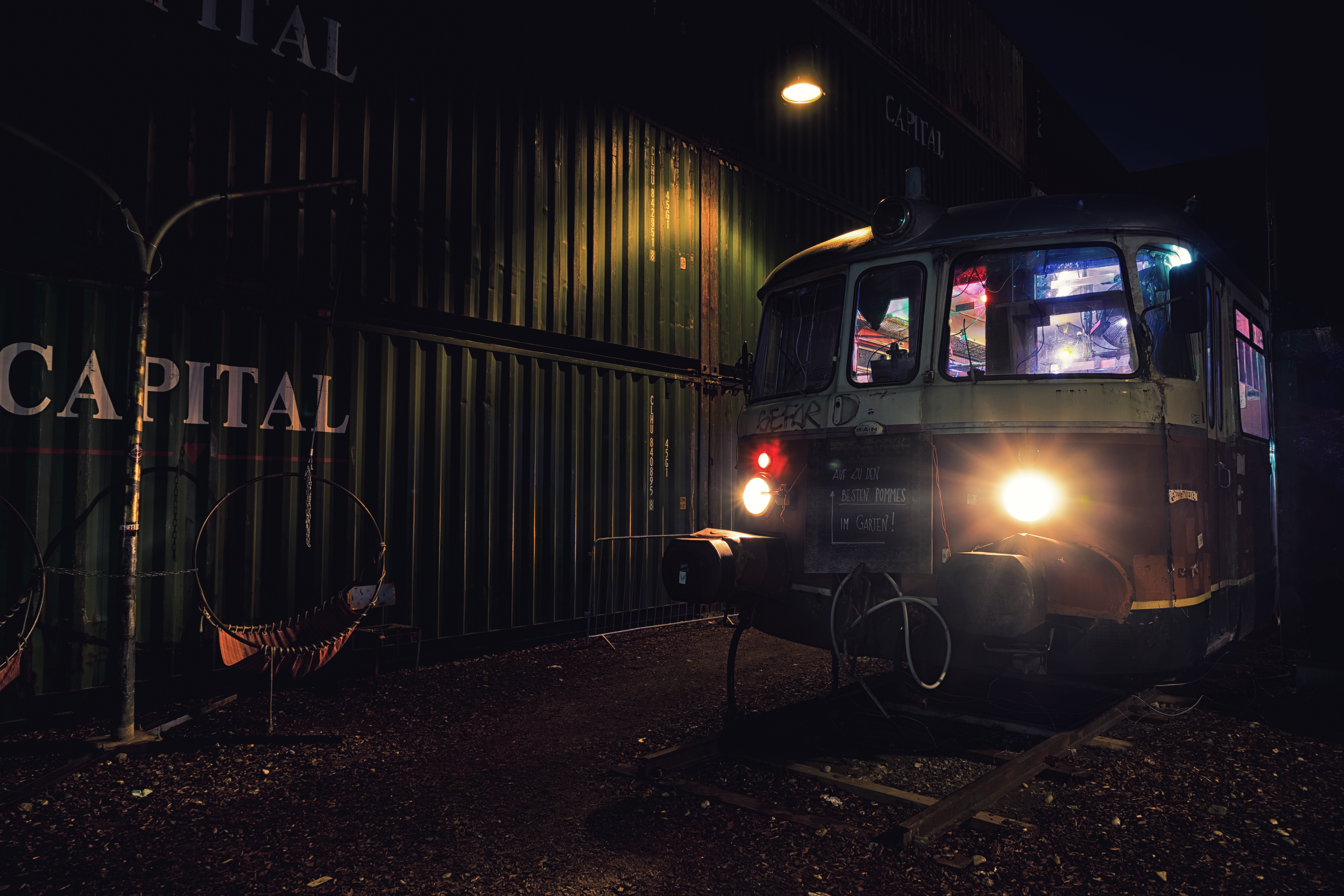
Railbus of the Bahnwärter Thiel. 2017

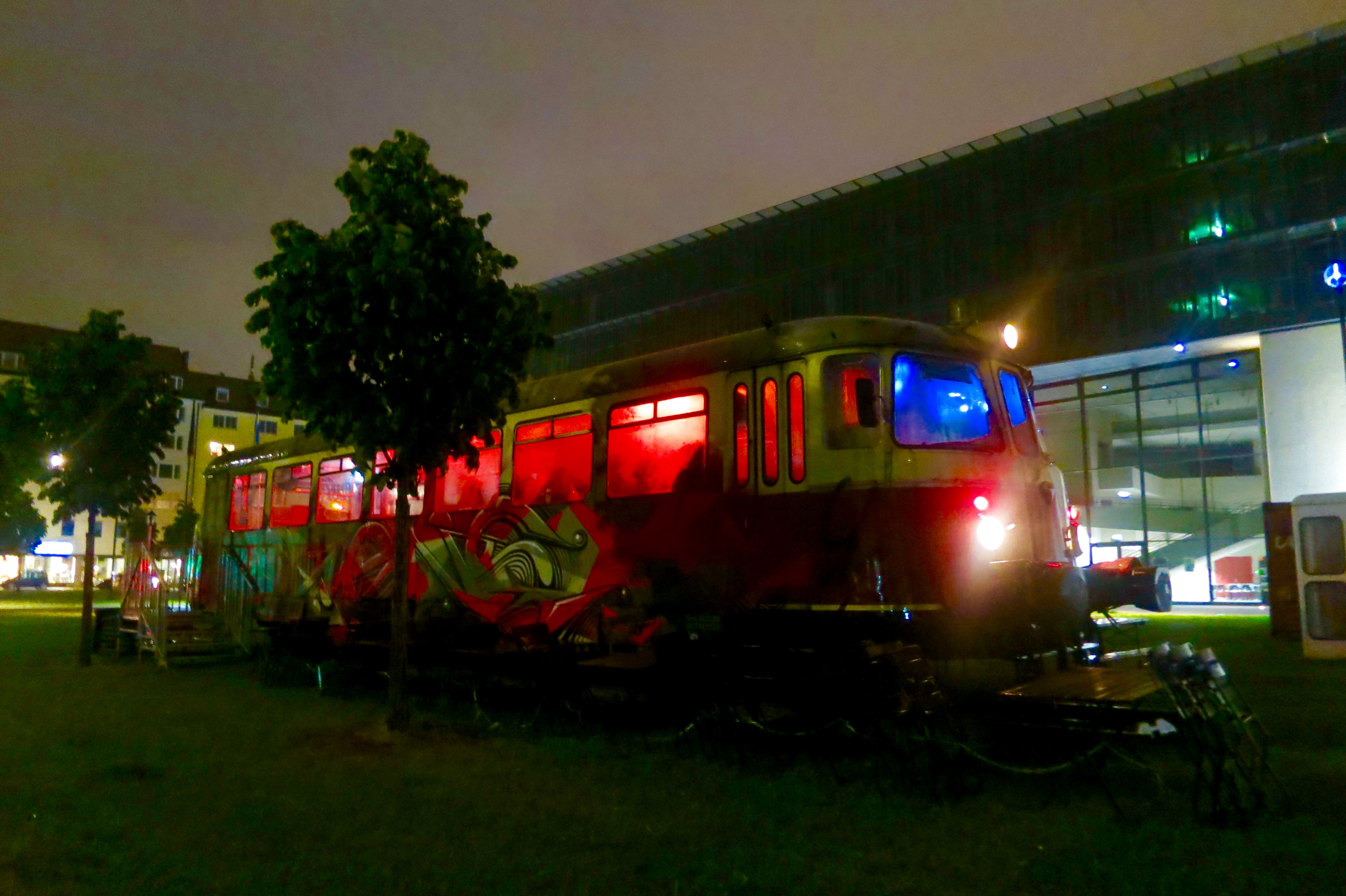
Minna Thiel in front of the University of Television and Film in May 2016

Graffiti and street art on shipping containers that are being used as cultural space at the Bahnwärter Thiel. 2024

Repurposed intermodal shipping containers at the Bahnwärter Thiel. 2024

A view of the Bahnwärter Thiel taken from the railway line. It also shows the outer wall on Tumblinger street which is the longest legal graffiti wall in Munich. 2024
