= Lycée Jean Renoir (Munich) =

French international school in Munich, Germany

Coordinates: 48.1243°N 11.5423°E

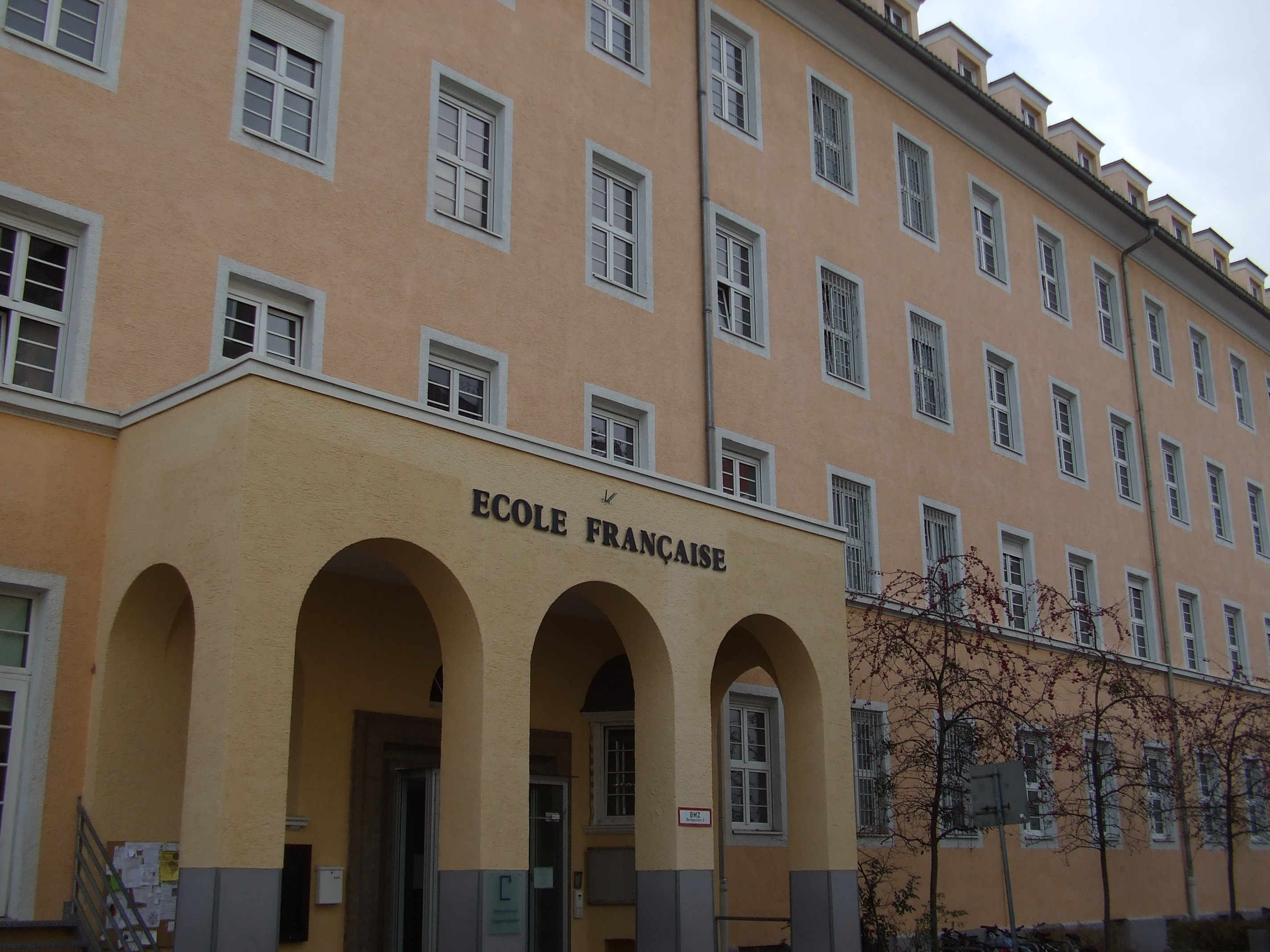
Secondary campus of the Lycée Jean Renoir

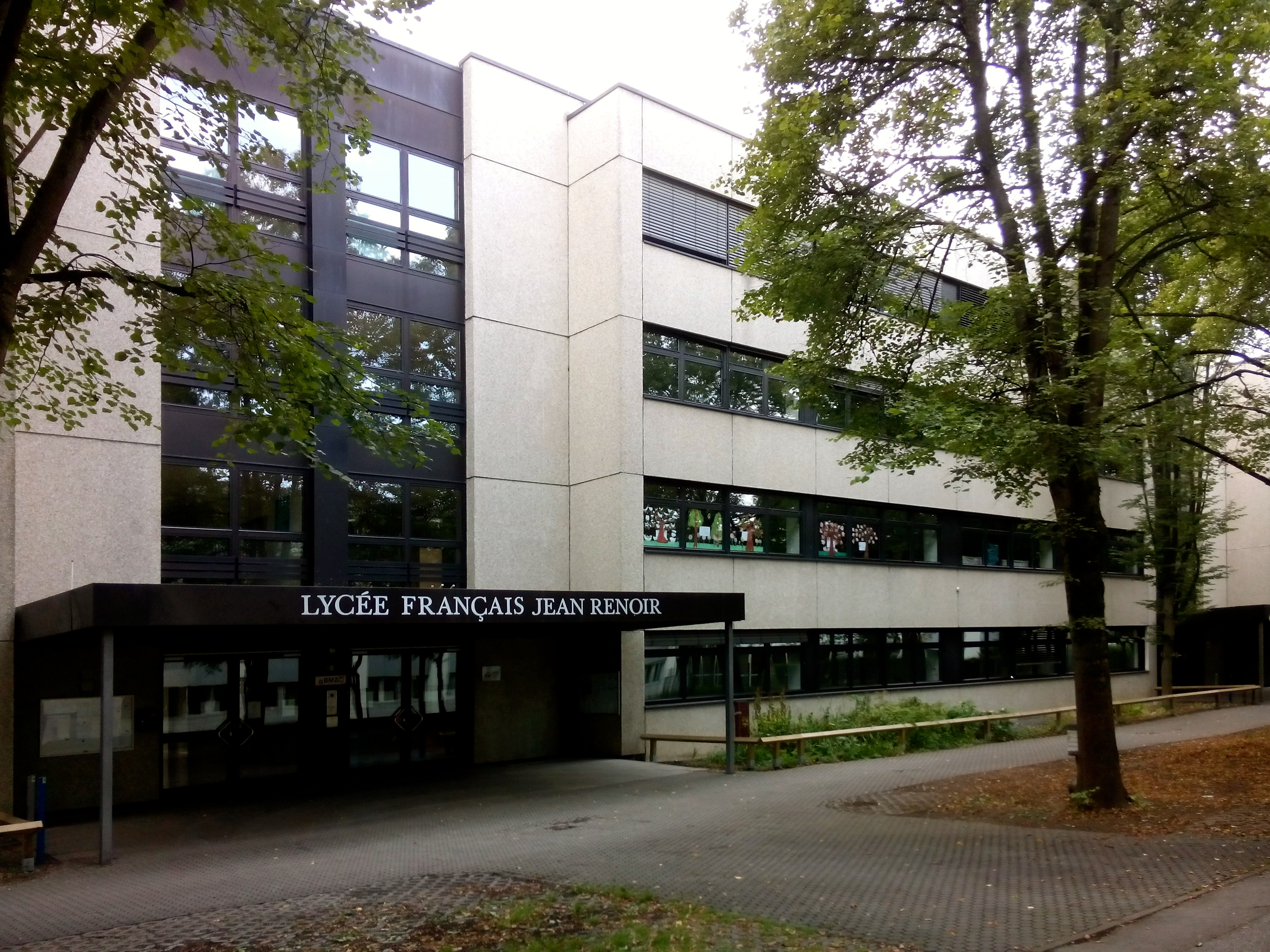
Primary campus

Lycée Jean Renoir (German: Französische Schule München) is a French international school in Munich, Germany, operated directly by the Agency for French Teaching Abroad. About 1,415 students attend the school. It serves levels maternelle (preschool) through lycée (senior high school).

The primary school is located in Giesing while the secondary school is in Sendling. The largest class sizes are 20-25 students.

== History ==
It was established in 1953. Named after the director Jean Renoir, it had 165 students in 1965. It moved into a standalone campus at Oettingenstraße.

== See also ==
- La Gazette de Berlin

German international schools in France:

- Internationale Deutsche Schule Paris
- DFG / LFA Buc
- Deutsche Schule Toulouse
