= Elisabethmarkt =

Coordinates: 48°09′25″N 11°34′28″E

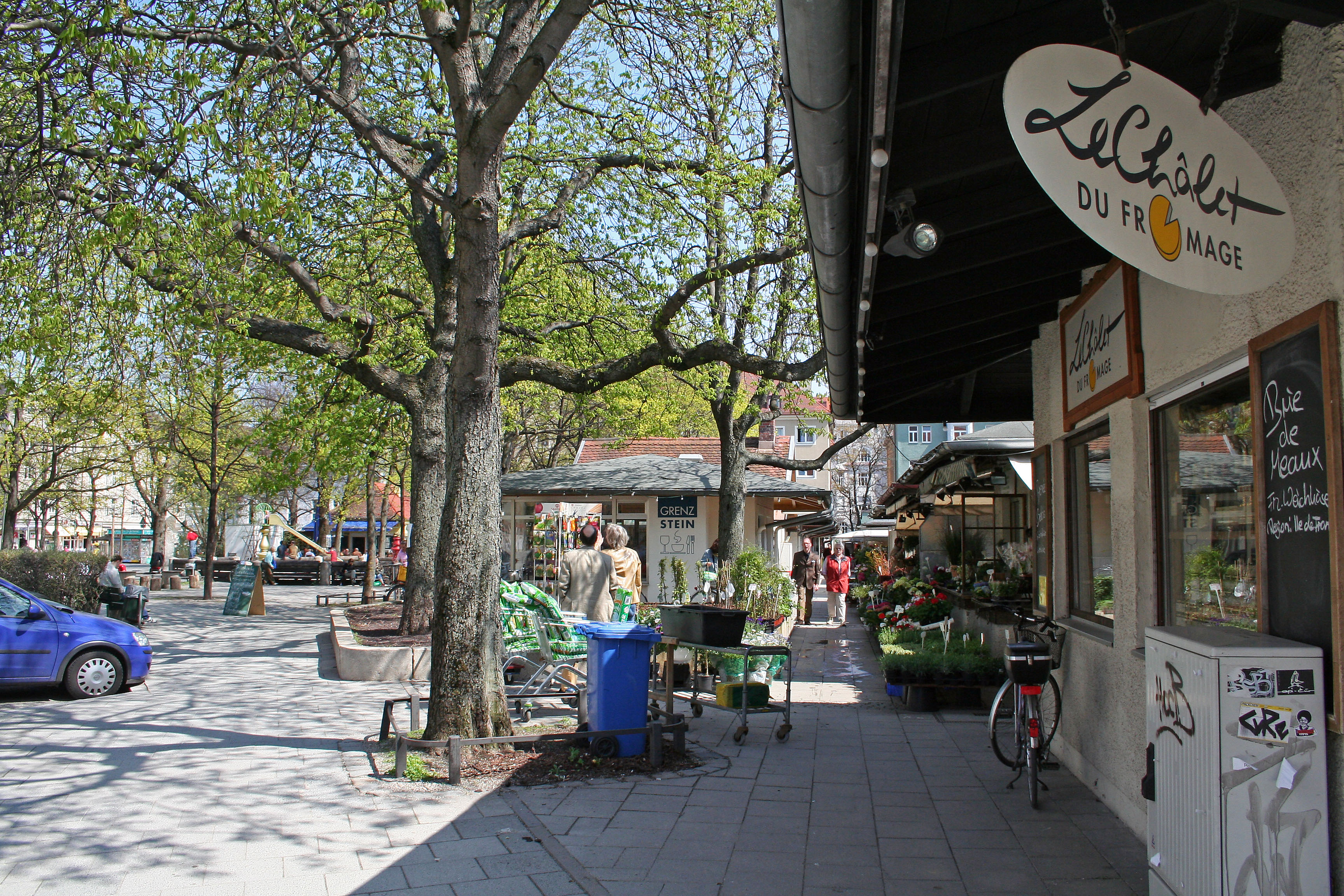
Elisabethmarkt in 2006. Since 2021, the market is being rebuilt and modernized.

The Elisabethmarkt is a daily food market in Schwabing, a district of Munich, Germany.

Deep in the heart of Schwabing, the inhabitants (and of course all the visitors) have been able to supply themselves with fresh groceries for more than 100 years. This market, which was named after the Austrian Empress Sisi, offers the entire range from meat and poultry, fruit and vegetables to delicatessen and snacks.

== History ==
Elisabethplatz and Elisabethstrasse were named in 1898 after the Empress Elisabeth of Bavaria of Austria, better known as Sisi. She was the daughter of Duke Max of Bavaria and the cousin of King Ludwig II of Bavaria In 1854 she married Emperor Franz Joseph I, after whom the Franz-Joseph-Straße had already been named in 1894. The couple occasionally spent time with their relatives in Schwabing.

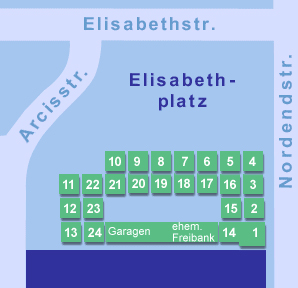
Map of Elisabethmarkt

The market on Elisabethplatz was founded in 1931. Its roots, however, go back much farther because the Elisabethmarkt developed from the former market at Maffeianger, founded in 1880, which had to be moved from Maffeianger to Elisabethplatz due to planned road constructions. Thus, the market on Elisabethplatz came into being following the decision of the municipal authorities on 1. October 1903.

During the mobilisation for World War II the market had its own inscription office, where it was possible to sign up for war loans. The market itself consisted of a few permanent market stalls as well as daily stands, which the municipal authorities auctioned every five years or which were raffled by the market inspector. The market hall on Elisabethplatz which was already built in 1903, was destroyed by bombs in World War II, which also severely damaged the entire market. Business, however, was maintained as far as possible by the improvisational skills of the vendors and the city council. After World War II the market was restored and the market hall was replaced by pavilions which are still the main trait of this market today.

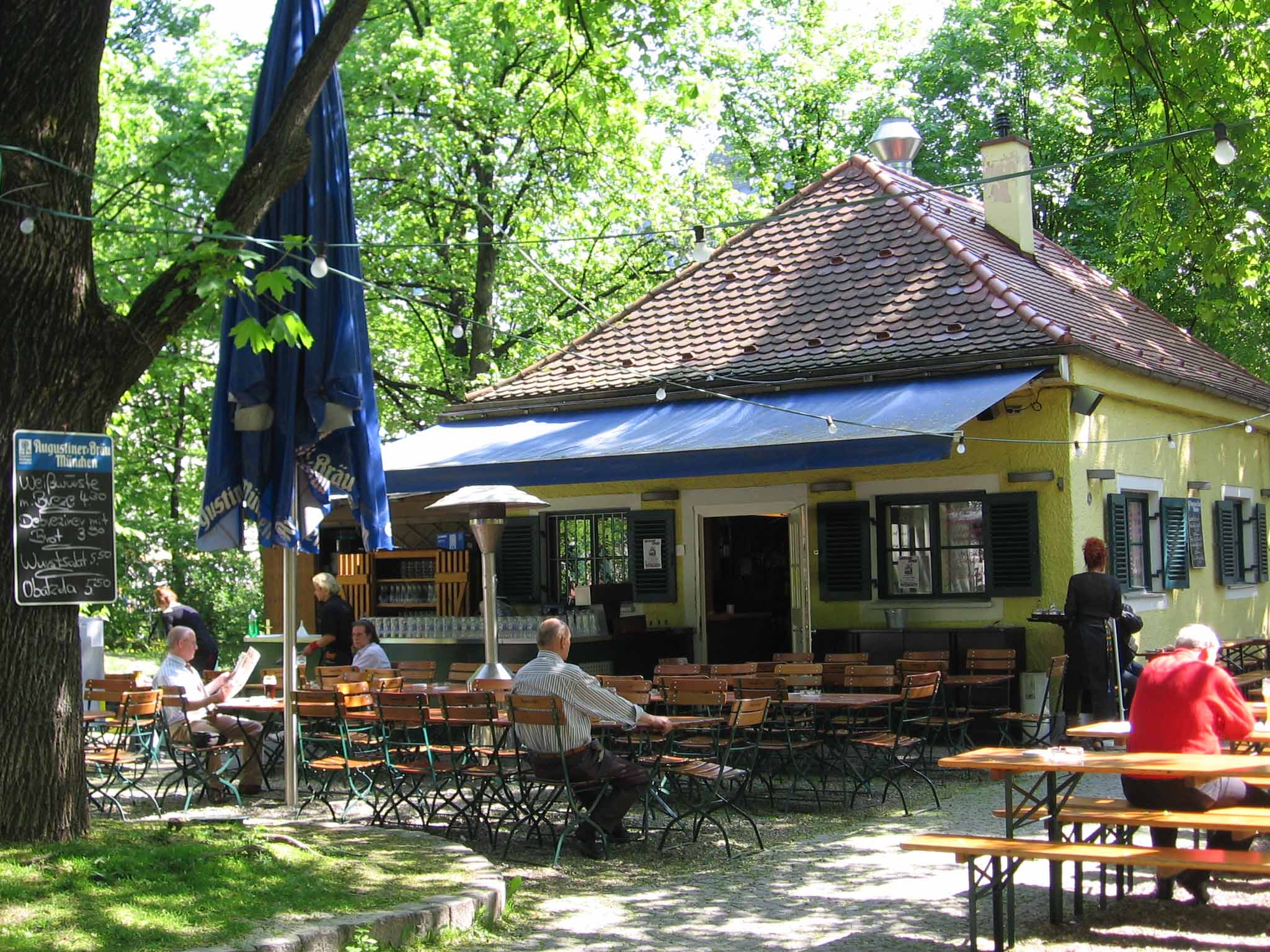
Wintergarten (2006)

The pavilion which is called the "Milchhäusl", or Milk Hut, is located towards Nordendstraße and dates from the late 1900s. The construction was initiated by the physician and teetotaller Carl Brendel, who personally supervised the distribution of milk every morning from 5 a.m. on. His priority was the population's health, especially the task of “keeping the poison of alcohol from the people”. Yet, in the long term he was not entirely successful - nowadays a small restaurant with a beer garden is located here.

== Administration ==
The Elisabethmarkt is organized by the Wholesale Market Munich. The Wholesale Market Munich, together with Elisabethmarkt, Viktualienmarkt, Pasing Viktualienmarkt, Wiener Markt and the Weekly Markets in Munich, are operated by Munich Markets, a municipal company run by the City of Munich.
