= Weekly markets in Munich =

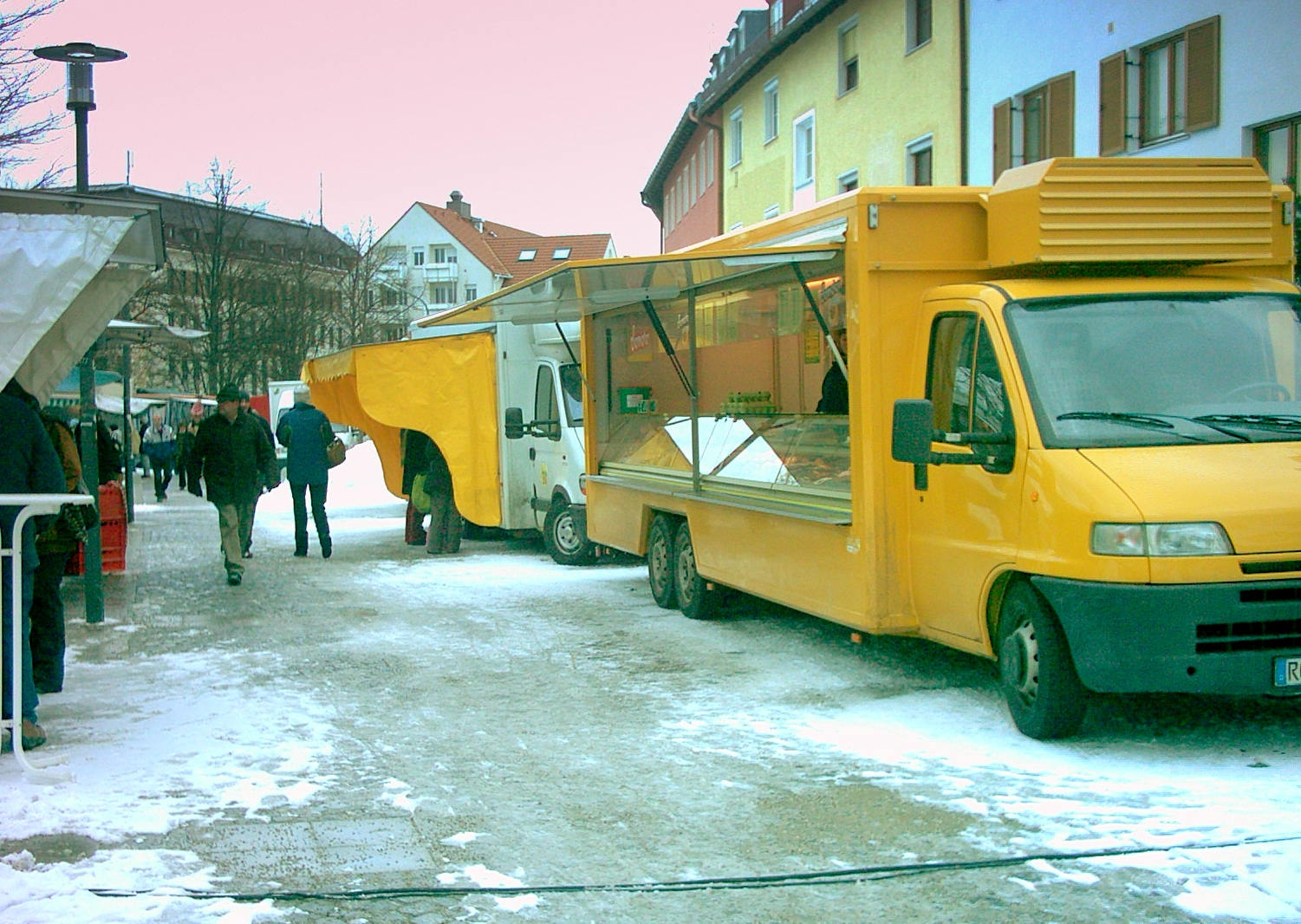
Farmer´s Market at Mangfallplatz

The weekly markets in Munich, Germany, are an important source of food to the residents of the city. The population of the city is provided with groceries by 41 weekly markets, including farmers’ markets and organic food markets on a daily basis. These markets can be found all over Munich.

== History ==
As it was too expensive to maintain permanent food markets (such as Viktualienmarkt) in some areas, the city authorities established markets that take place once or twice a week for a few hours or an entire day. The markets are supplied by mobile producers who provide the people of Munich with groceries, flowers and non-food products.

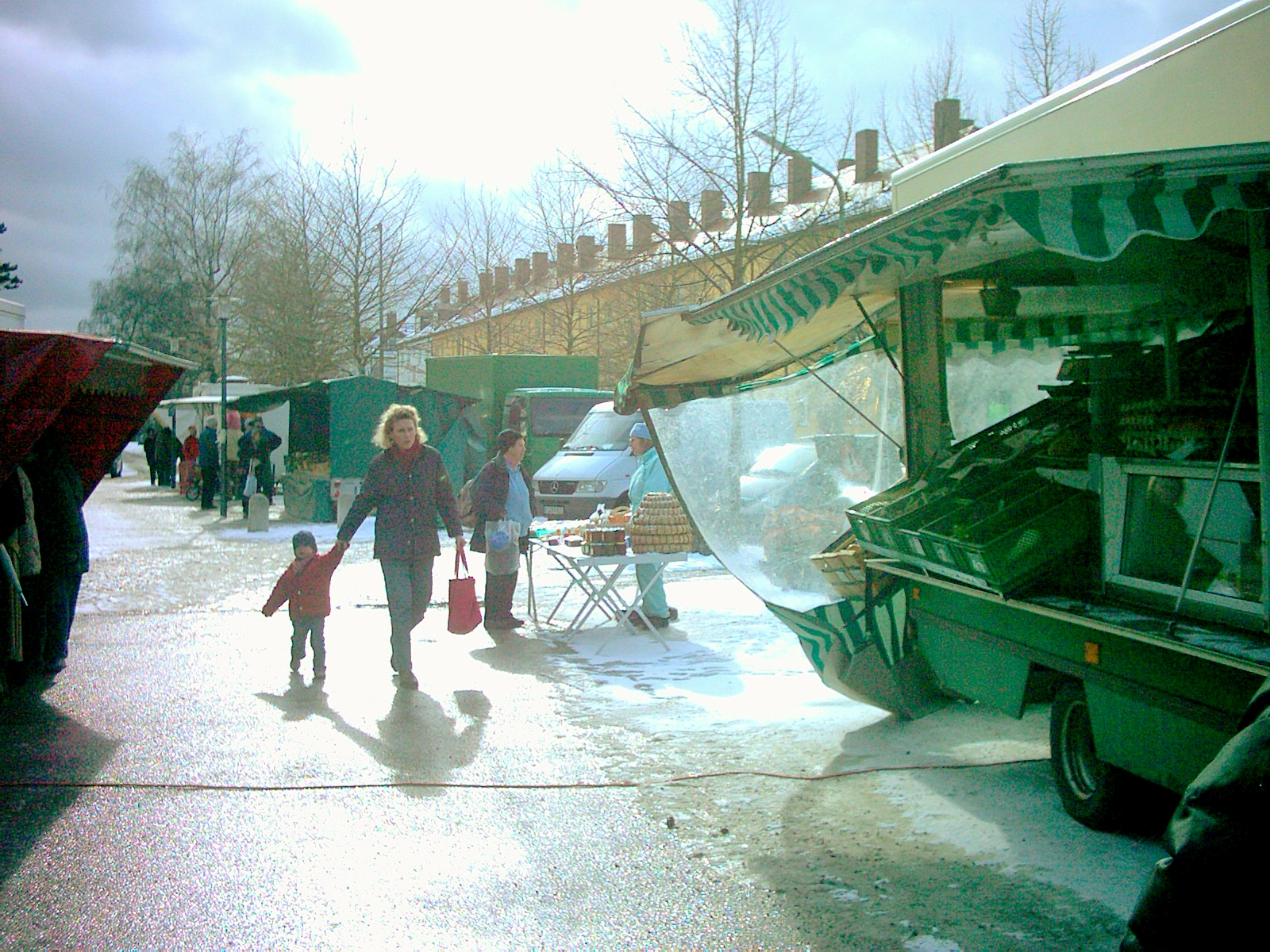

On 20 May 1969 the first weekly market was opened in Plettstraße (Neuperlach), followed by markets in Berner Straße (Fürstenried-Ost), Wellenkampstraße (Hasenbergl) and Graubündener Straße (Fürstenried-West).

The markets’ trial year went down well with Munich’s population and in 1970 responsibility was handed over to the administration of the Großmarkthalle (Great Market Hall).

In spring 1989, farmers’ markets began for a test period – under the patronage of the association of Munich’s weekly markets. Responsible for this market concept is the Bauernmarkt München e. V. (Munich’s Farmers Market Registered Society) founded by the Bavarian Farmers’ Organisation. In contrast to professional market vendors, stall-holders on farmers’ markets have to be small farmers and members of the Bauernmarkt München e. V.

In 1996 Munich’s first weekly organic market was opened on Pfanzeltplatz (Perlach). Usually organic food market are smaller than conventional weekly markets.

== Administration ==
The weekly markets are organized by the Wholesale Market Munich who, together with Viktualienmarkt, Elisabethmarkt, Pasing Viktualienmarkt, Wiener Markt and the Weekly Markets in Munich, are operated by Munich Markets, a municipal company run by the City of Munich.

== See also ==
- Charter
- History of marketing
- List of farmers' markets
- Market (place)
- Market hall
- Market town
- Retail
