= Munich Markets =

Munich Markets (German: Markthallen München) is the name of the merged municipal company, which includes the Wholesale Market Munich and the Munich Slaughterhouse. The premises are situated in the Munich Sendling and Ludwigsvorstadt districts.

== History ==
The idea to merge these two adjoining municipal companies existed for a long time. On 1 December the city council decided about the merger, which became effective on 1 January 2007.

== Company ==
The Munich Markets includes:

- Wholesale Market Munich
- Munich Slaughterhouse
- Elisabethmarkt
- Weekly Markets in Munich
- Pasing Viktualienmarkt
- Viktualienmarkt
- Wiener Markt
