= Wiener Markt =

Haidhausen food market

Coordinates: 48°08′03″N 11°35′45″E

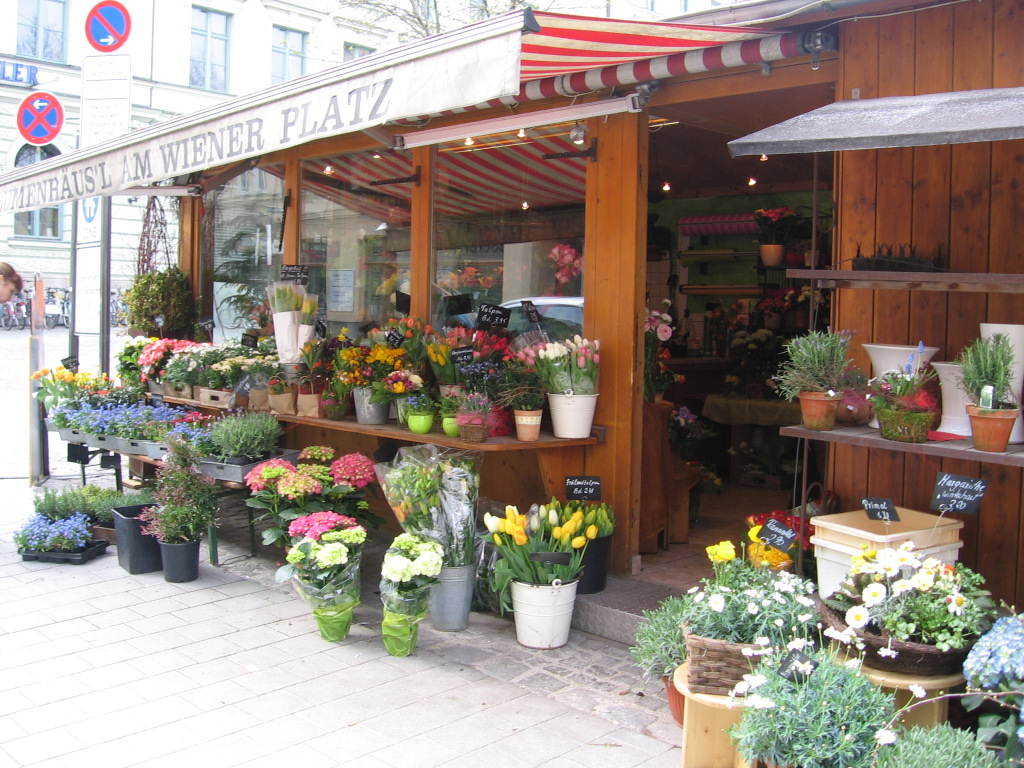
Wiener Markt

The Wiener Markt is a daily food market in Haidhausen, a district of Munich.

The market at Wiener Platz forms the centre of the district of Haidhausen.

== History ==
In 1891 "Wiener Platz" was named after the Austrian city of Vienna (Wien). This name was chosen because the "Innere-Wiener-Straße" which runs alongside the market used to be the link road to Vienna.

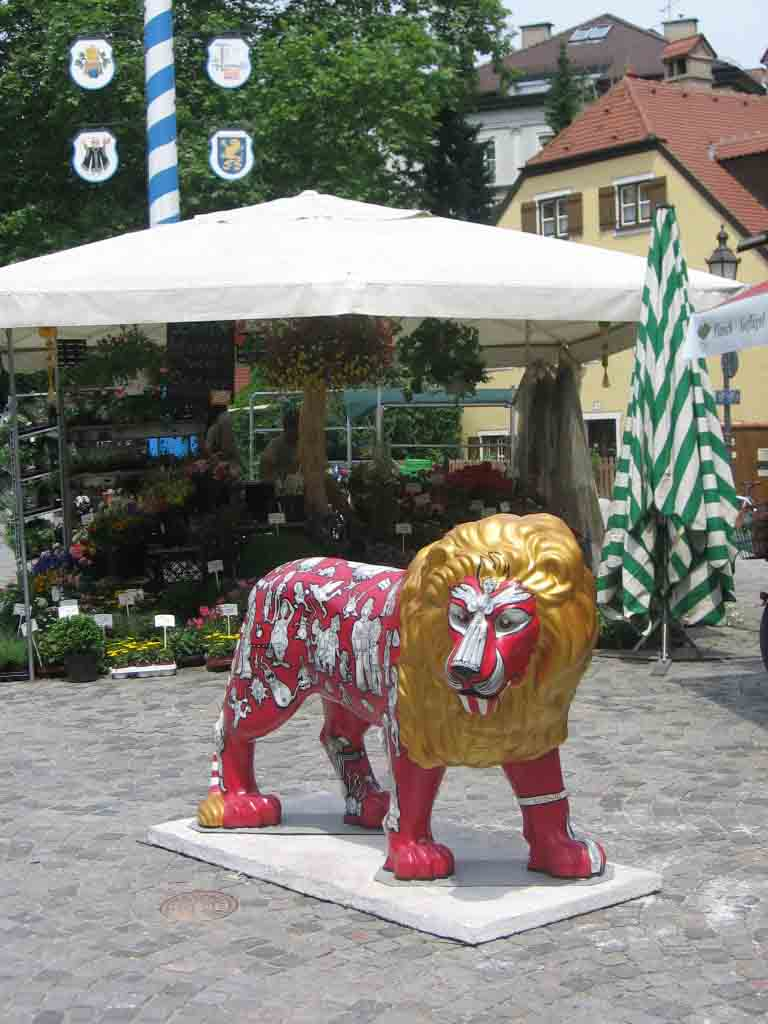
Lion of the Wiener Markt

The history of the "market at Wiener Platz", the smallest of Munich’s permanent grocery markets is long and eventful. On 1. November 1889, the market that had hitherto been held in the Preysingstraße was moved to its current location. An "announcement of the municipal authorities of Munich, Capital of Bavaria and Royal Residence on 25. October 1889", which was signed by the mayor, Dr. von Widenmeyer, is the "birth certificate" of the market. During World War II the market was severely damaged but was reconstructed in the post-war years. With the end of the renovation at Wiener Platz in October 2002, both Wiener Platz and Wiener Markt once again became jewels in the crown of the Haidhausen district. The grand May Day festival on 1. May 2003 and the putting up of the maypole, donated by the Friends of Haidhausen, clearly showed the central significance of the square and the market for Haidhausen.

== Administration ==
The Wiener Markt is organized by the Wholesale Market Munich. The Wholesale Market Munich, together with Wiener Markt, Viktualienmarkt, Pasing Viktualienmarkt, Elisabethmarkt and the Weekly Markets in Munich, are operated by Munich Markets, a municipal company run by the City of Munich.
