= Pasing Viktualienmarkt =

Coordinates: 48°08′51″N 11°27′43″E

The Pasing Viktualienmarkt is a daily food market in Pasing, a district of Munich.

Situated next to the Pasing Town Hall, in a beautiful courtyard, the Pasing Viktualienmarkt offers everything you could wish for: bread and cheese, fish and meat, flowers and herbs. For almost a century the market has supplied the people of Pasing, who at that time were not citizens of Munich (that is why there are two markets called "Viktualienmarkt" in Munich), with fresh groceries in best quality.

== History ==
The nomination of Pasing as a city in 1905 is the beginning of the history of Pasing Viktualenmarkt. The city council decided to establish a market for vegetables, fruits and plants on 9 July 1906. It was decided to hold the market at the south-western corner of the Pasing Marienplatz opposite the Institut der Englischen Fräulein. In January 1907 the Royal Government of Upper Bavaria granted permission for this. The layout of the market turned out to be something of a problem as everyone built their stalls in the way they wanted. Ultimately they came to terms and the first market day was held on 16 March 1907. From the beginning the market was well accepted, but the customers were only people from Pasing so that an efficiency calculation was carried out in 1908. This showed that the Viktualienmarkt in Pasing was not really profitable. The reason for this was that itinerant traders sold their goods more cheaply at the verge of the market as they did not have to pay a fee. This problem was solved by changing the market regulations.

The constantly increasing traffic led to the relocation of the market in the courtyard of the municipal property Hindenburgstrasse (Baeckerstrasse), which was decided on 15 November 1929 by city councillor Dr. Hoesch. However, vendors did not agree with that decision as they feared an enormous drop in sales due to the lack of walk-in customers. With a delay of three months the relocation finally started on 1 April 1930. As the stalls could not be deconstructed, they had to be transported as a whole by carts. The relocation took a whole day. Despite the traders’ fears, the number of customers increased more and more so that they were soon running out of space again. For this reason they decided to finally build a solid, modern and large market hall. As work proceeded fast, they were able to move in already on 2 October 1937. On that day already eight of the twelve available stalls were occupied. Commodities such as fruits, berries, tropical fruits, poultry and milk were sold. The gardeners of Pasing also presented their wares. On the opening day the North Sea fish hall and the municipal cheap meat counter moved into the hall.

From the opening in 1907 until today Pasing Viktualienmarkt has changed its appearance only insignificantly and even during renovation and reconstruction work it did not lose its unique character. That is why the people from Pasing have every right to be proud of their “Viktualienmarkt”.

== Administration ==
The Wiener Markt ist organized by the Wholesale Market Munich. The Wholesale Market Munich, together with Pasing Viktualienmarkt, Viktualienmarkt, Wiener Markt, Elisabethmarkt and the Weekly Markets in Munich, are operated by Munich Markets, a municipal company run by the City of Munich.
