= Ida Schumacher =

Bavarian comedienne and folk actress

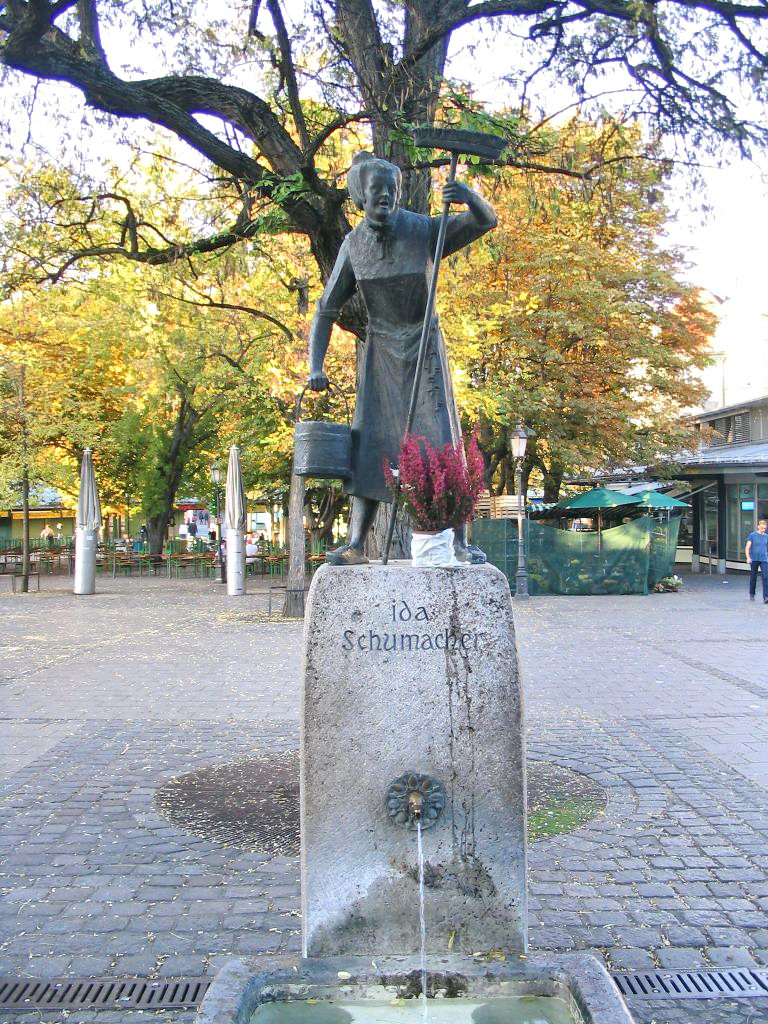
Ida Schumacher Water Fountain at Viktualienmarkt by Marlene Neubauer-Woerner, 1977

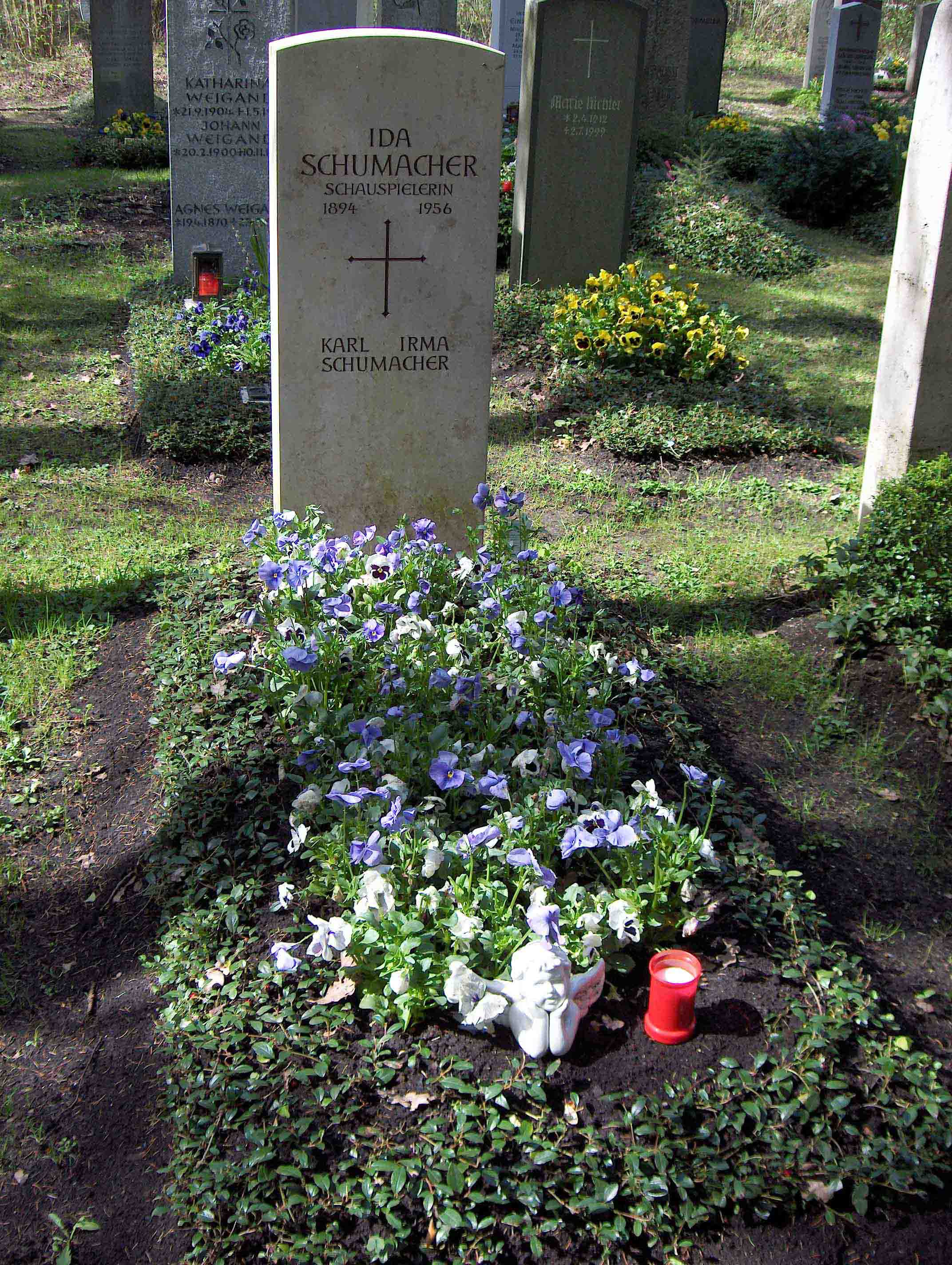
Burial site of Ida Schumacher

Ida Schumacher (born 5 March 1894 in Arnstorf, Niederbayern (Lower Bavaria), as Ida Stömmer and died on 6 April 1956 in Gauting) was a Bavarian theatre actress and comedienne.

== Life and career ==
Born in 1894 in Arnstorf, Ida Schumacher was first discovered at the age of thirteen for the choir of Münchner Künstlertheater (Munich Artist Theatre). Later, she studied singing but lost her voice in 1930 due to severe cold. She developed paralysis of her vocal cord, which resulted in her famous trademark of speaking with hoarse, constricted voice.

After several engagements at various theatres, Ida made an unprecedented late career as “Ratschkathl” from 1949 to her death in 1956. During that period, she was very successful as a folk actress at the theatres in Nuremberg, Tegernsee, and at Platzl in Munich.

Her role as Ratschkathl was unforgottenable due to the marvellous stage designer, who created Elise Aulinger, and perfected Ida Schumacher. Her famous figures included the Oardandlerin (Bavarian dialect for egg seller) and the Trambahnschienenritzenreinigungsdame (loosely translated as streetcar track grooves cleaning lady).

== Honour ==
As one of only six Münchner folk actors and singers, she was honoured in 1977 with a fountain monument topped with bronze figure, created by Marlene Neubauer-Woerner, at Viktualienmarkt. A street in her birth town, Arnstorf, is named after her.

Her burial site is at Waldfriedhof in Munich. The plot number is No. 222-2-219.

== Incident ==
During the night of 29 August 2020, her bronze statue and stone column were found detached from the fountain and toppled down. An attempt to pry the bronze statue from the stone base caused the damage to her anchoring. A brush was broken off from the stem and disappeared. An investigation is still ongoing with vandalism or collision with a vehicle being the probable cause.
