= Münchener Ratsch-Kathl =

German weekly newspaper

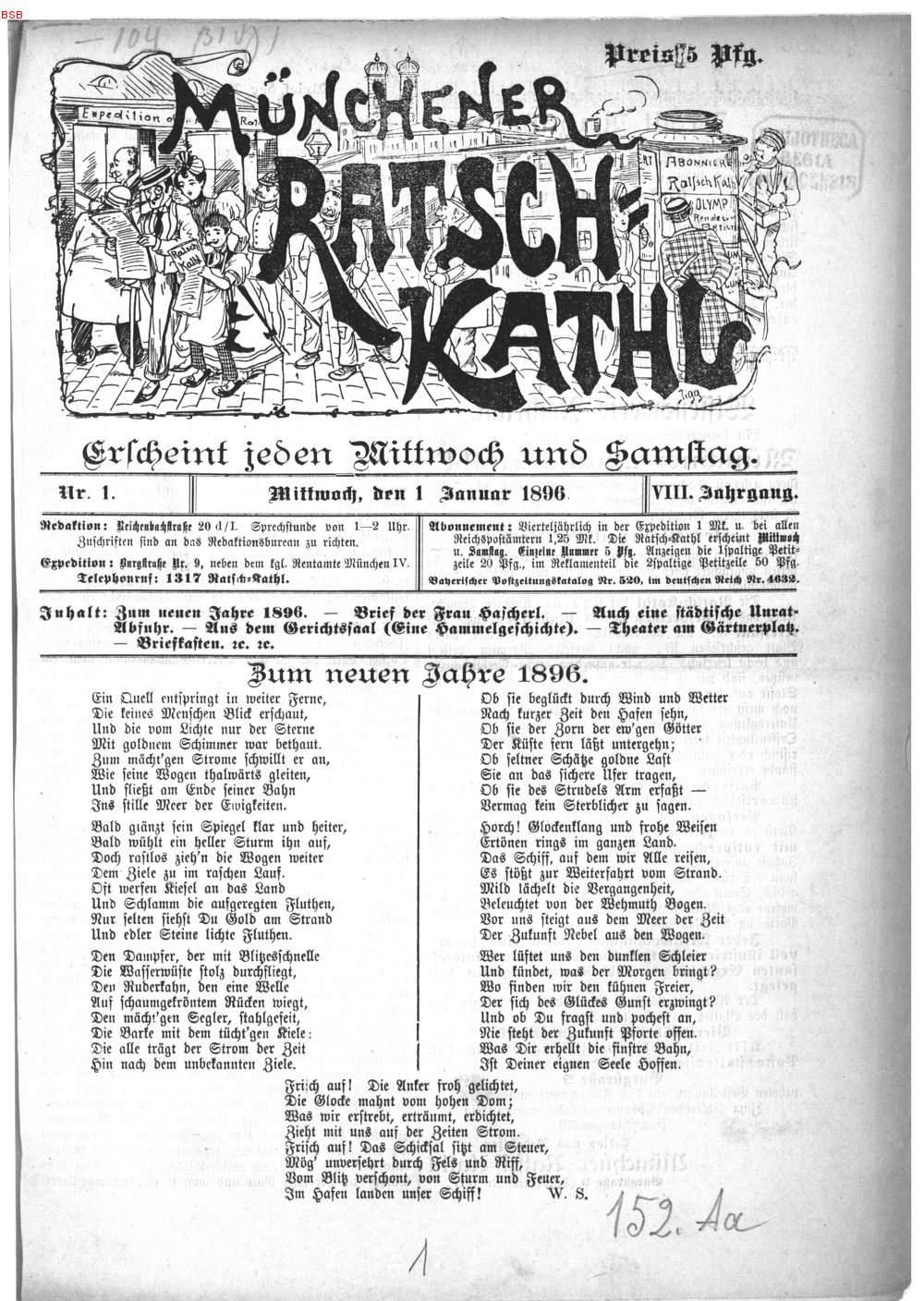
Cover January 1898

Die Münchener Ratsch-Kathl, later Münchener Stadtanzeiger (not to be confused with the Münchner Stadtanzeiger), was a weekly newspaper published in Munich from 1889 to 1921. It referred to itself as an Unterhaltungsblatt für gemüthlichen Verkehr ("entertainment paper for genial circulation"). The nickname "Ratschkathl" ("rattlepuss") was an established synonym for a "chatty and gossip addicted woman" in the Bavarian dialect at that time. The newspaper compared itself with the Ratschkathl on the front page of its initial edition of May 11, 1889.

The price of the first and second editions was 10 Pfennigs. It was edited by D. Mämert at Platzl 5, and published at Westermühlstraße 4. Further editions cost only 5 Pfennig. As early as the beginning of 1890, the paper had a weekly print run of 5,000 copies. Originally the paper was published only on Saturdays, but due to its popularity a Wednesday edition was soon added.

In 1908, the newspaper was renamed to Münchener Stadtanzeiger und 'Ratsch-Kathl' and once more in 1915 to Münchener Stadtanzeiger. In its last year, the title of the newspaper was Bayern-Warte und Münchener Stadtanzeiger.

The newspaper specialised in local news, and also included stories, serials, riddles, jokes and advertisements. Some copies are now in the Bavarian State Library.
