= Josef Ackermann (journalist) =

German journalist (1896–1959)

- Born: 31 January 1896; Munich, Germany
- Died: 22 August 1959 (aged 63); Zürich, Switzerland
- Occupation: Newspaper journalist

Josef Ackermann (31 January 1896 – 22 August 1959) was a German journalist.

== Biography ==
Ackermann became contributing editor of the Weißenburger Tagblatt in 1917, and of the Telegraphen-Union in Munich. He was permanent Landtag rapporteur for the Münchner Zeitung and the Bayerische Staatszeitung. During the Third Reich he was imprisoned in Stadelheim Prison, in the KZs Dachau, Buchenwald and Dora-Mittelbau.

After World War II he became director of the municipal intelligence service of Munich. Ackermann was correspondent of Die Welt. From 1948 to 1951, he was head of the "Verband der Berufsjournalisten in Bayern" (association of professional journalists in Bavaria).

In April 1945, he was founder and chief editor of the Münchner Stadtanzeiger. Ackermann was member of the Senate of Bavaria from 1950 to 1955. He was member of the executive board of the Deutscher Journalisten-Verband (German journalist association) and member of the Arbeitsgemeinschaft kommunaler Presseamtsleiter. The Ackermannstraße in Munich was named in honor of him in 1960.

== Literature ==
- Helga Schmöger and others: Der Bayerische Senat. Biographisch-statistisches Handbuch 1947–1997, Düsseldorf, Droste-Verlag, 1998, p. 133 (Handbücher zur Geschichte des Parliamentarismus und der politischen Parteien; vol. 10) ISBN 3-7700-5207-2 (in German)
