= Ratschkathl =

Ratschkathl is a stock character of the Bavarian popular theatre. The Bavarian language name literally translates as 'rattlepuss', meaning a gossiping woman. The name has become a popular slang term for an overly gossipy woman. The inventor of this stage character was the Bavarian folk actress Elise Aulinger. Later on, the character was perfected by the Bavarian folk comedian Ida Schumacher.

== See also ==
- Münchener Ratsch-Kathl
