= Münchner Stadtanzeiger =

Weekly newspaper in Munich

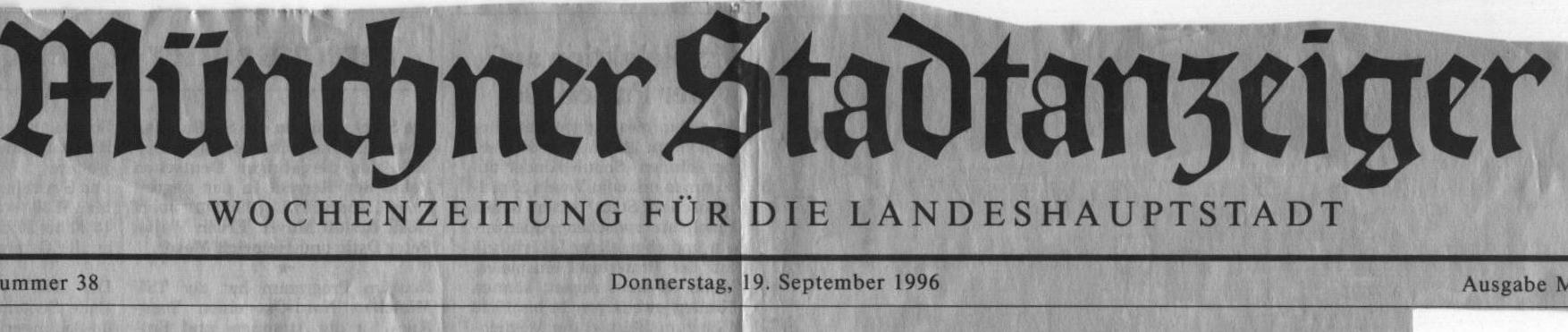
An edition of the Münchner Stadtanzeiger paper from 1996

The Münchner Stadtanzeiger was a weekly newspaper published in Munich from at least 1936 to 1997. From 1950 to 1997 it was published by the Süddeutsche Verlag. It referred to itself as a Heimatzeitung für die Stadt und den Landkreis Munich (homeland newspaper for the city of Munich and for the district of Munich).

The Münchner Stadtanzeiger was founded by the German journalist Josef Ackermann (1896–1959) who was imprisoned in Nazi concentration camps for several times, who became director of the municipal intelligence service after World War II, and later member of the Senate of Bavaria. From 1959 to 1989 Erich Hartstein (b. 1925) was head of the editorial department. At this time, the newspaper was published twice a week as a supplement of the Süddeutsche Zeitung. In 1997, the content of the newspaper merged into the local news section of the Süddeutsche Zeitung.
