= Marlene Neubauer-Woerner =

German sculptor (1918–2010)

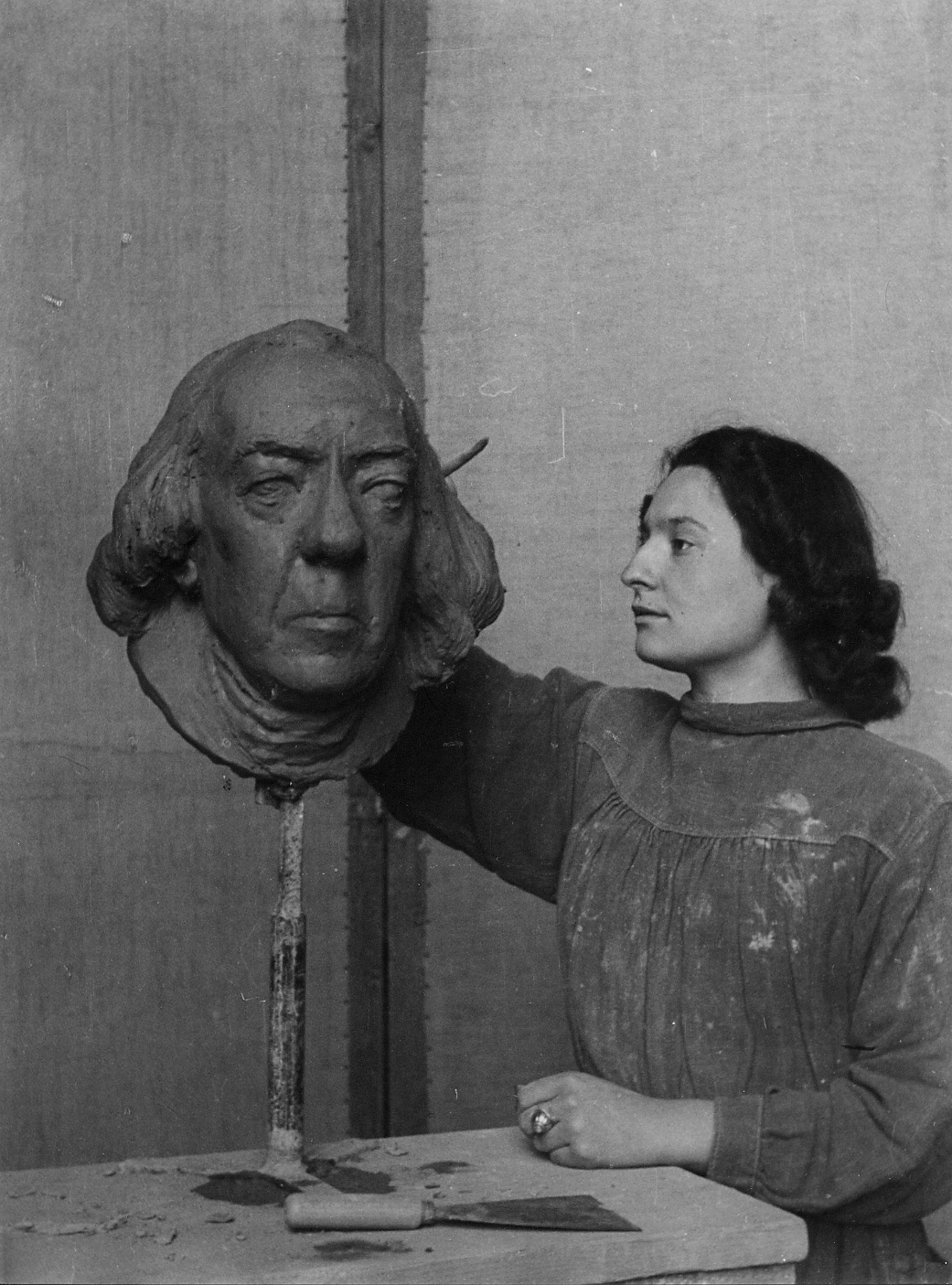
- Marlene Neubauer-Woerner working on a portrait about 1939

Marlene Neubauer-Woerner (1918 – 2010; née Marlene Woerner), was a German sculptor. She was born in Landshut, Germany.

== Life ==
In 1932, after the death of both parents, she attended the state school for ceramics in Landshut and completed her master's degree in ceramics when she was only 17 years old. She began her studies of sculpture in 1936 at the Academy of Fine Arts in Munich under the guidance of Josef Henselmann and Richard Knecht. At the academy she was the first woman to study sculpture for use with public buildings. Since 1945 Marlene Neubauer-Woerner has lived and worked as a freelance sculptor, based in Munich. From 1952 she has been a member of the Sezession, an association of artists in Munich and from 1958 a member of GEDOK, a German group of women artists. In 1978 she was honoured with the Schwabinger Kunstpreis (Art Prize) and in 1984 she received the Bavarian Order of Merit. She was a guest of honour at the Villa Massimo, Rome, in 1987. The cities of Cologne, Vienna, Paris and Athens have honoured her with their medals. She died on January 1, 2010, in Munich.

She often found inspiration for her motifs in ancient mythology and Catholicism. Her son exhibited her works in her former home until 2014; today they are located in the Seligenthal Monastery in Landshut, where Neubauer-Woerner attended school as a child in the 1920s.

== Exhibitions ==
Between 1949 and 1989, she exhibited her sculptures at the annual Haus der Kunst in Munich. She had individual exhibitions at the Münchner Residenz and in the city hall of Landshut. In addition, she participated in exhibitions in major European cities (Musee d´Art Moderne in Paris, Zappion in Athens, Palazzo Nazionale in Rome, Palais Palffi in Vienna)
