= Viktualienmarkt =

Market square in Munich, Germany

Coordinates: 48°08′07″N 11°34′34″E

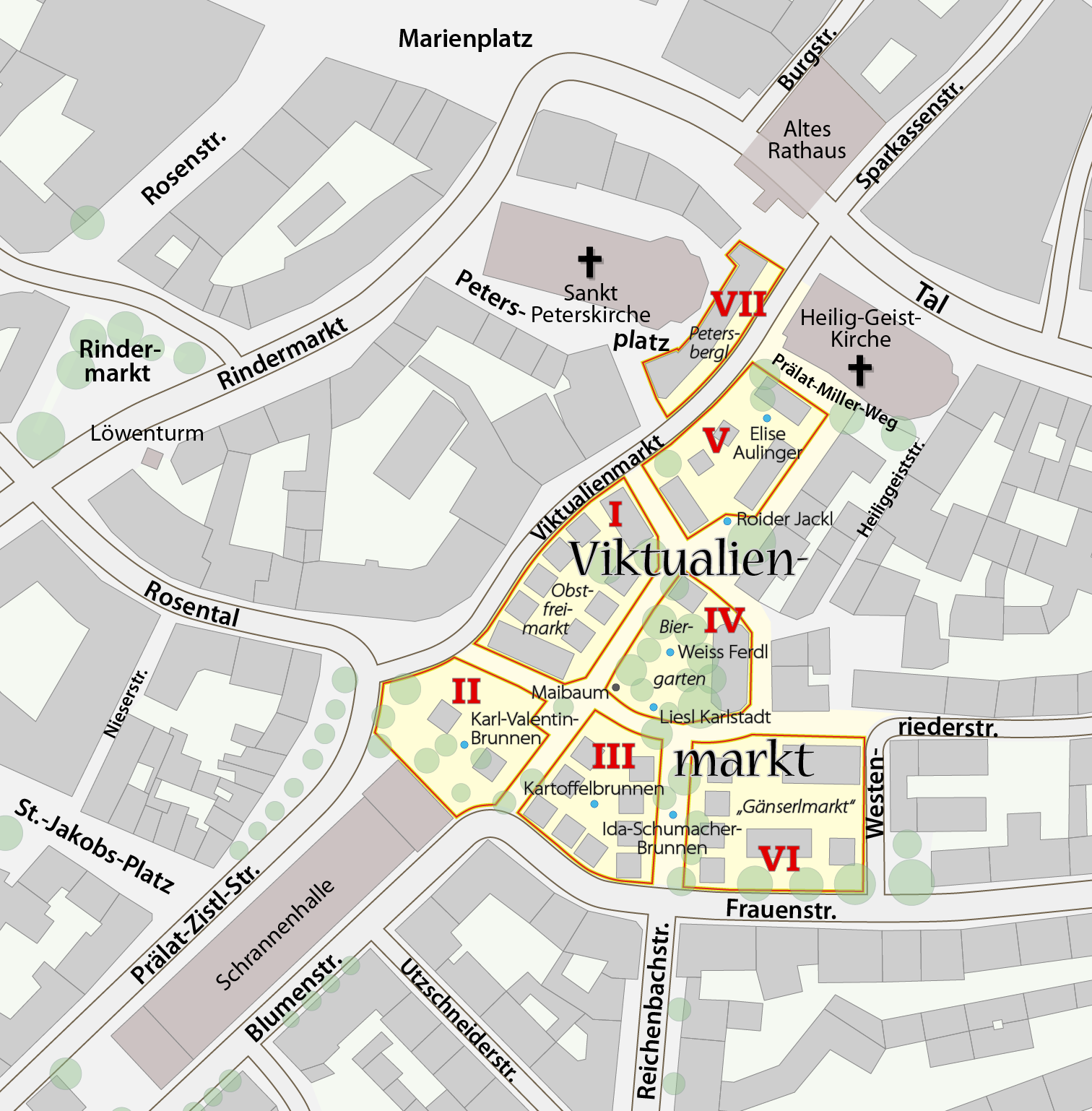
Map of the Viktualienmarkt

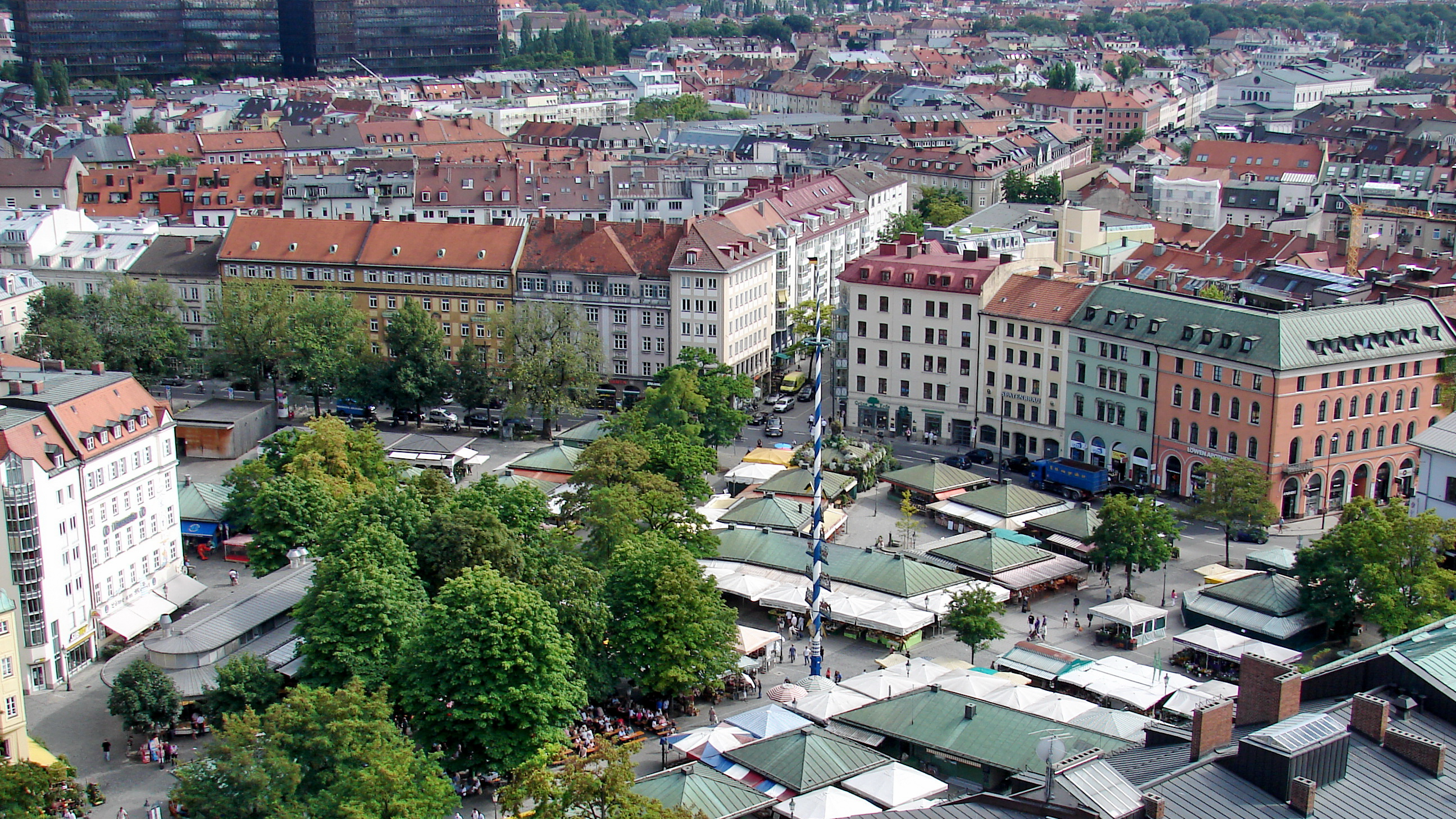
The market as viewed from nearby Peterskirche

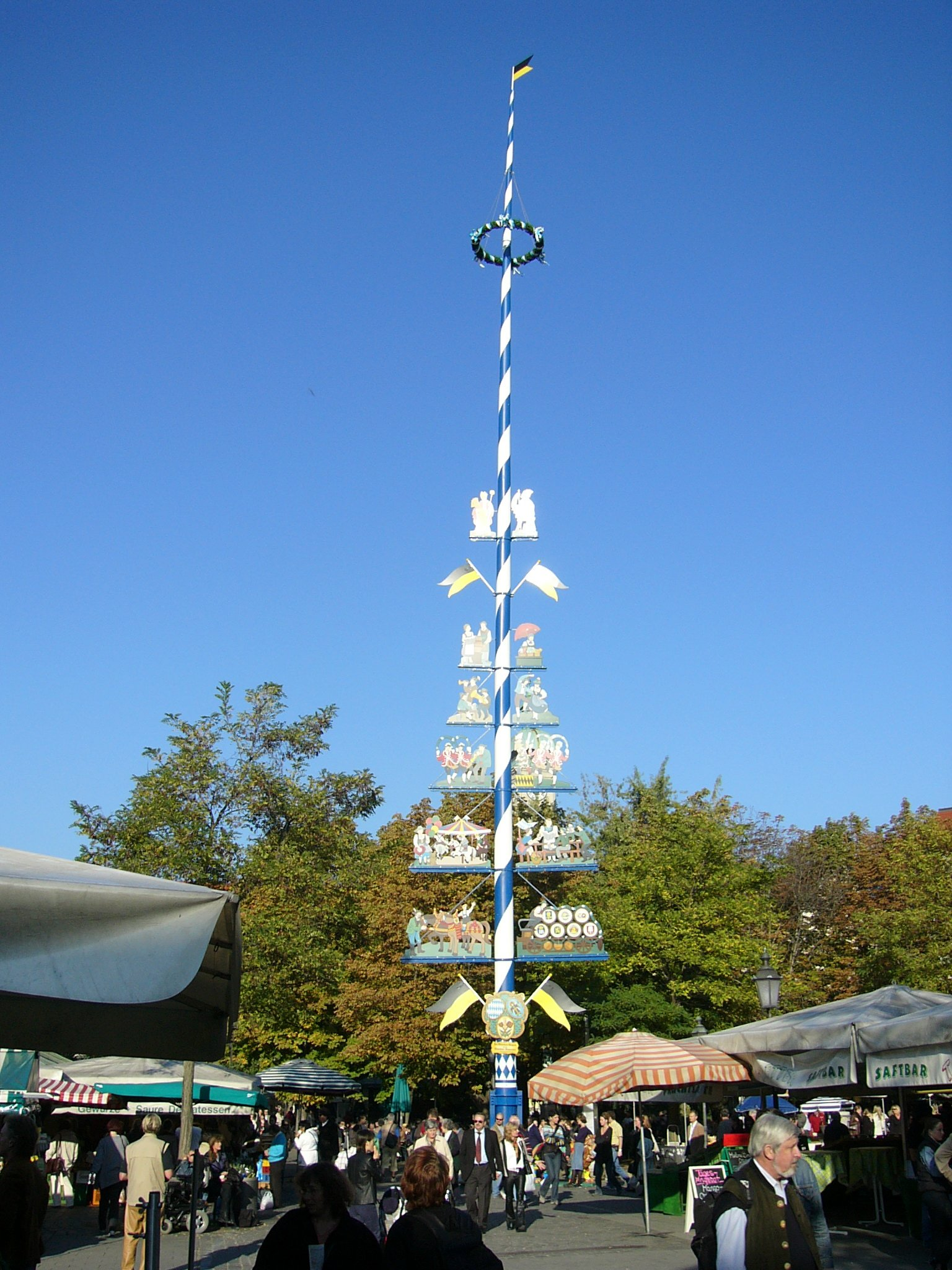
Maypole on Viktualienmarkt

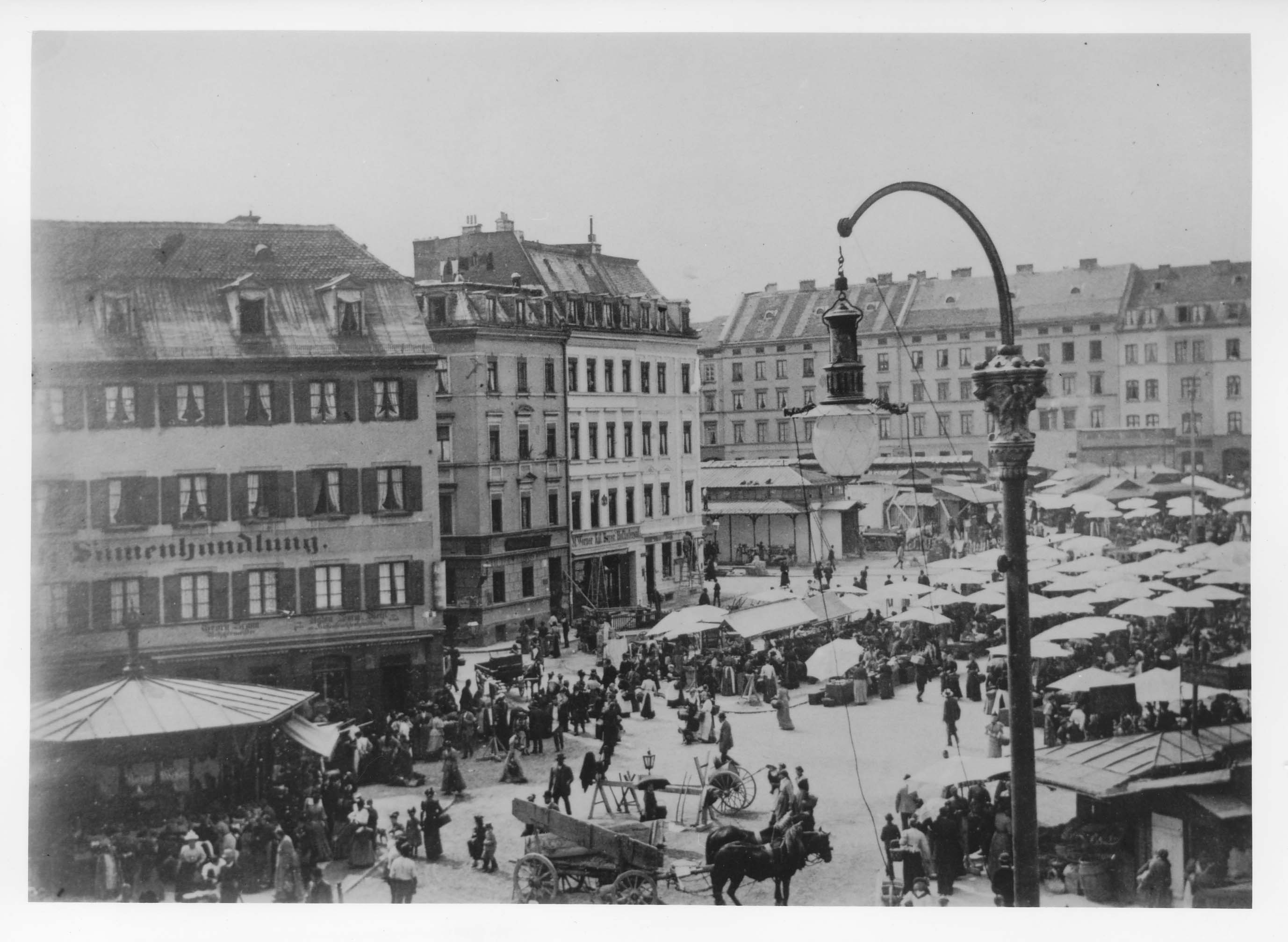
Viktualienmarkt in 1900

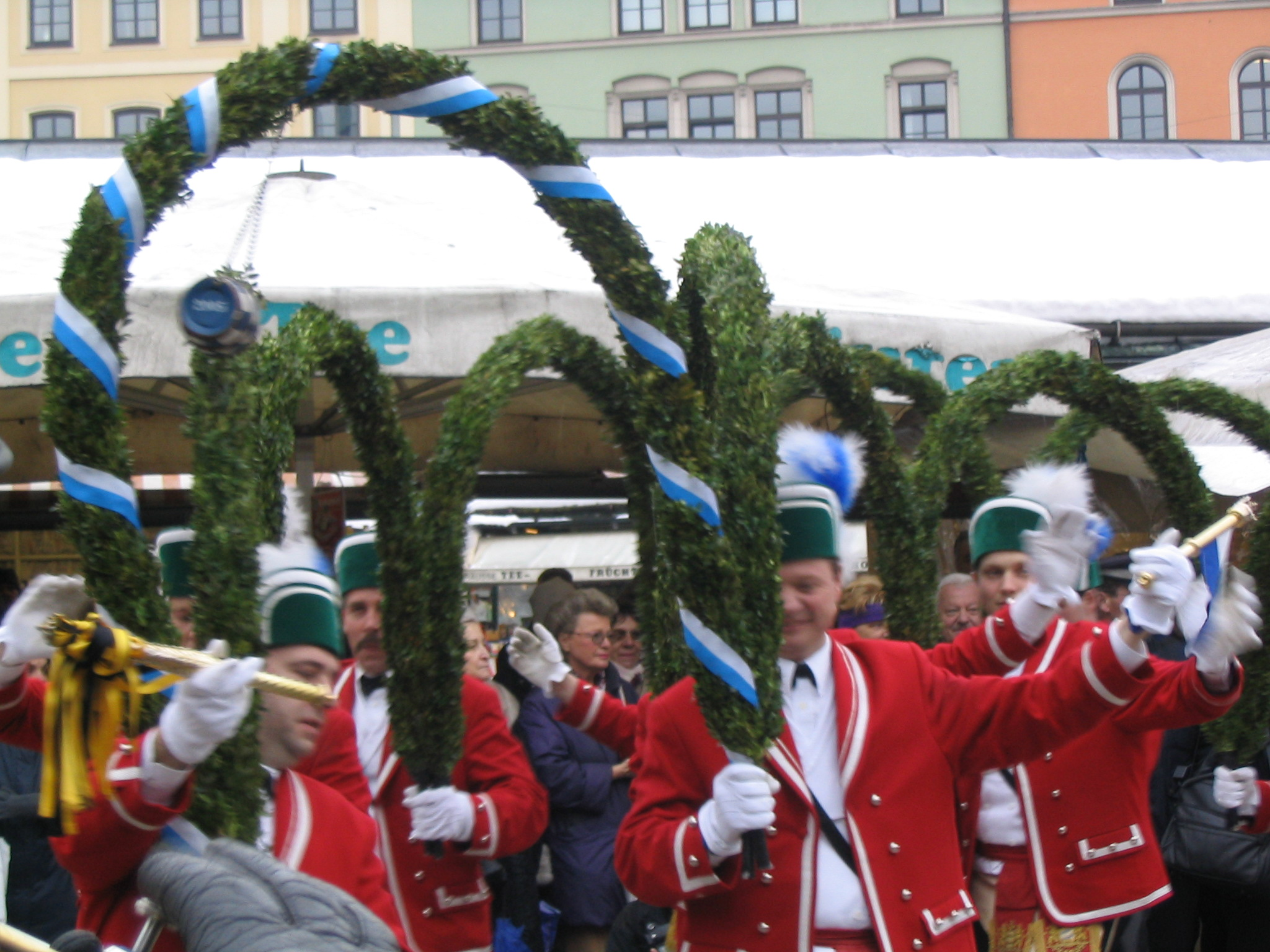
Traditional barrelmakers dance

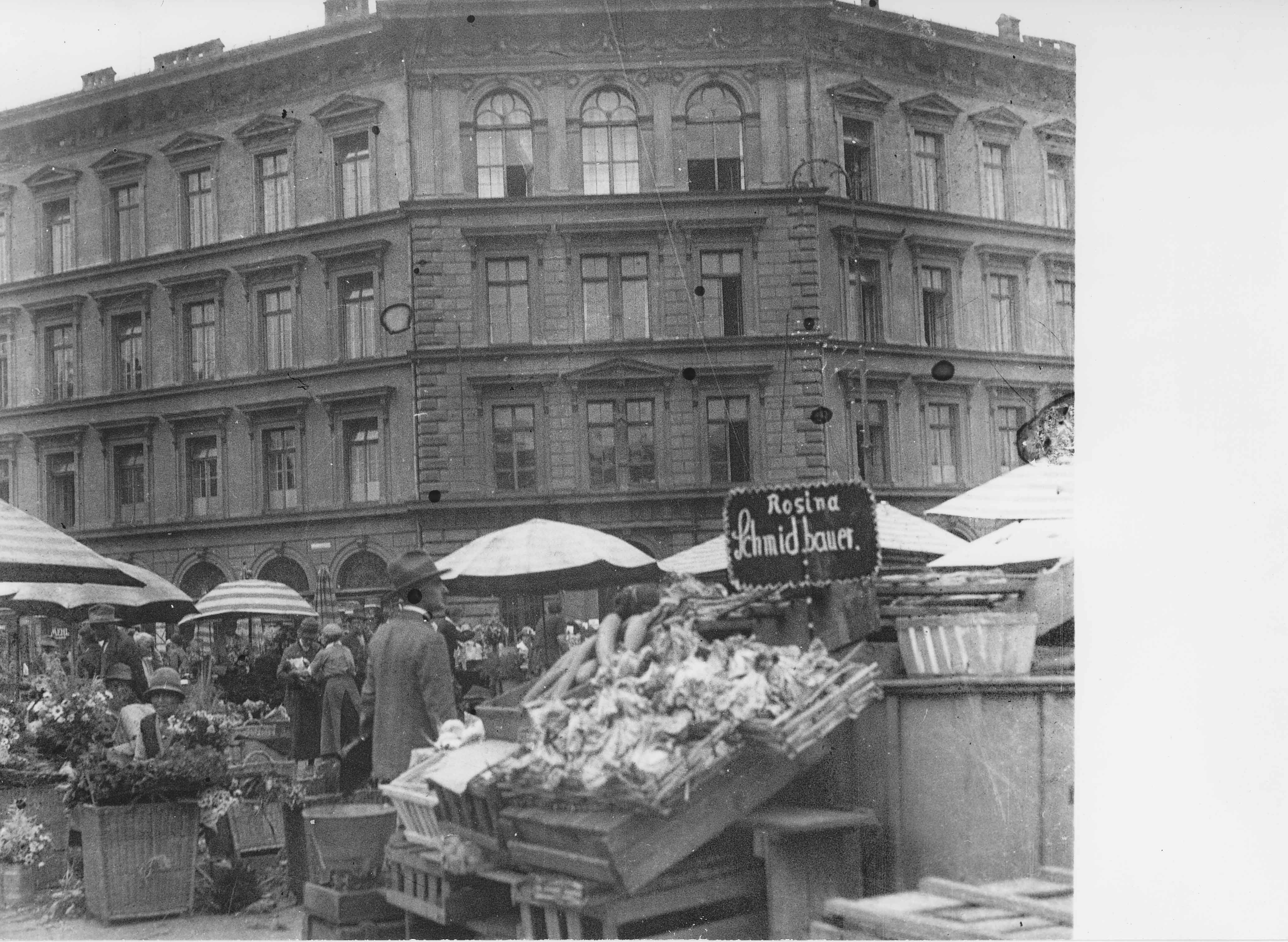
Viktualienmarkt in 1930

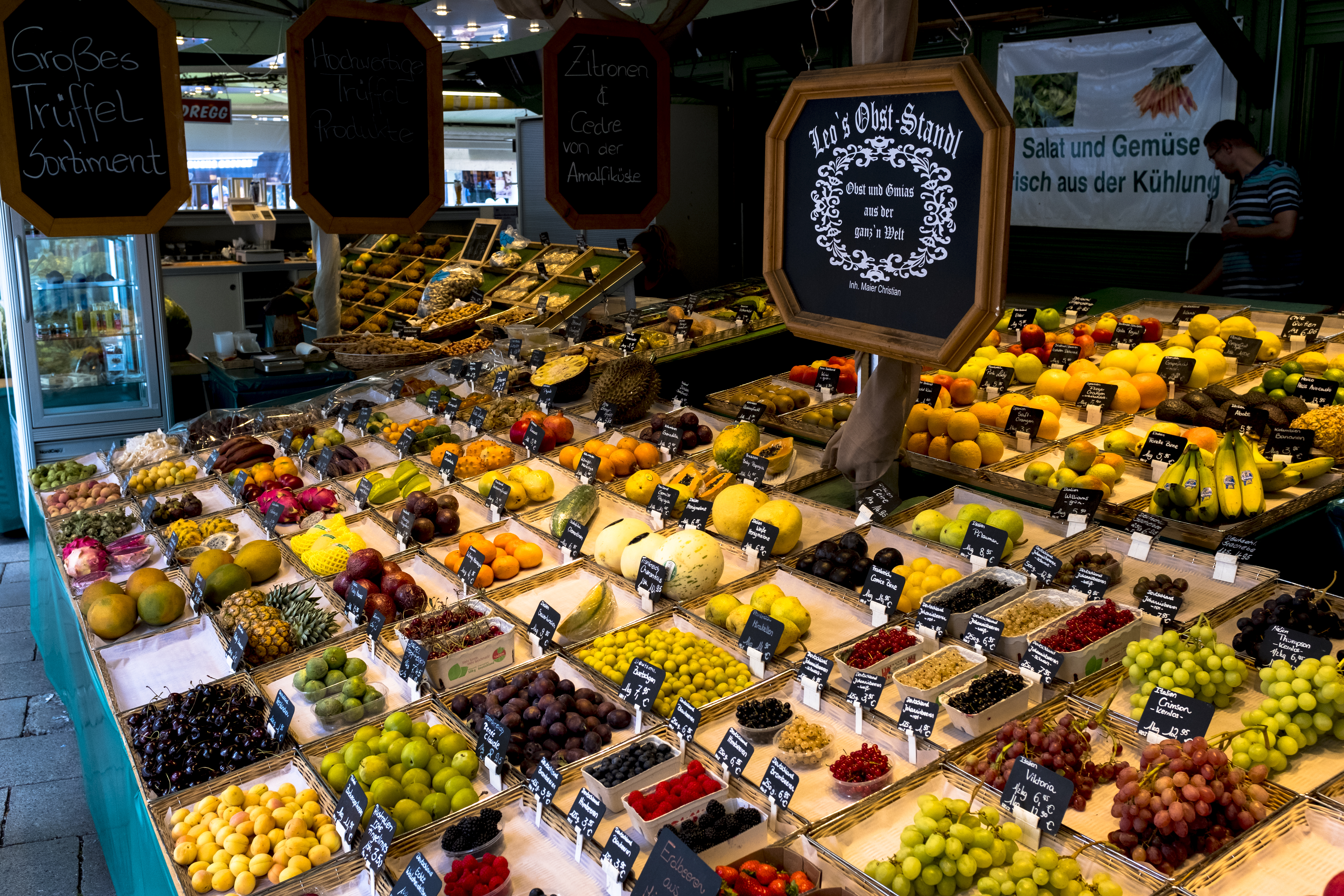
A stall at Viktualienmarkt

The Viktualienmarkt is a food market and a square in the center of Munich, Germany. With the exception of Sundays and holidays, it has been held daily since 1807.

The Viktualienmarkt developed from an original farmers' market to a popular market for gourmets. In an area covering 140 stalls and shops offers items including flowers, exotic fruit, game, poultry, spices, cheese, fish, and juices.

== History ==
When today's Marienplatz (formerly Schrannenplatz) as a store for cereals and other agricultural products had become too small, Viktualienmarkt as its official successor evolved where it is still situated today due to a decree issued by King Maximilian I on 2 May, 1807. The King ordered that those parts of the market between Heiliggeist Church and Frauenstraße should be relocated and told municipal authorities to demolish the buildings of the Heiliggeist hospice which had been acquired by the city. Thus, the "green market" had its own place, which was also named "market place" for some time. It was only later that the word "Viktualien" (victuals), Latin for food, was used.

From 1823 to 1829 the central market already had to be enlarged significantly. In 1885 the ancient Heiliggeist infirmary was demolished and the Heiliggeist Church was extended to the west.

In 1852, the precursor of today's Großmarkthalle, the Schrannenhalle, was built close to the ancient city wall at the end of Blumenstraße. It burned down in 1932 and was re-opened in 2005.

In 1855 the fish market was moved to Westenriederstraße. Over the course of time many additions were made to the market, for example a butchers' hall, a tripe hall, pavilions for bakeries, fruit vendors and a fish hall. The butchers' shops at the foot of Petersbergl (Peter's hill, site of Peter's Church), the stalls for poultry and venison and the stands of the flower vendors expanded even further.

During World War II the square was severely damaged. There was talk of closing down the market in order to erect multi-story buildings. Instead, municipal authorities revitalized Viktualienmarkt with considerable financial support, and the citizens of Munich enriched it with memorial fountains for the folk singers and comedians Karl Valentin, Weiß Ferdl and Liesl Karlstadt. Later, memorial fountains for the folk singers and comedians Ida Schumacher, Elise Aulinger and Roider Jackl were added.

In a 2009 New York Times article about meals worth a plane trip across the Atlantic, food critic Mimi Sheraton picked a snack of sausages at the Viktualienmarkt.
