= Wholesale Market Munich =

Coordinates: 48°07′05″N 11°33′20″E

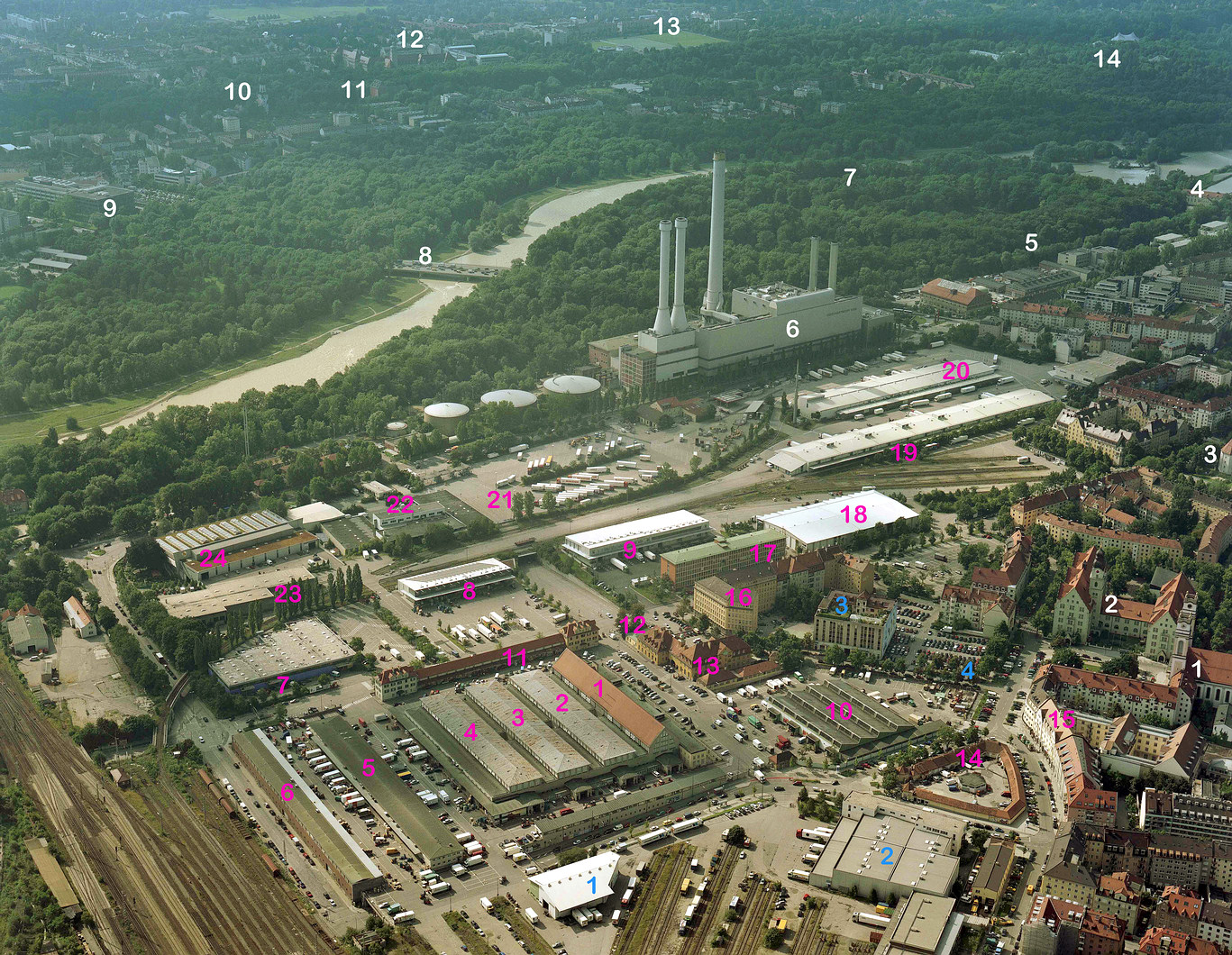
Aerial view of the Wholesale Market area

The Großmarkthalle München (Wholesale Market Munich) is a German-international wholesale market located in the Munich borough of Sendling. In an area of 310,000 m^{2}, 270 importing companies and wholesalers offer 140 different product classes from 83 countries with a sales volume of more than 750 million Euro. Additionally there are 65 horticultural producers, 45 florists and 15 wholesalers of miscellaneous lines. The market's geographical sales area is virtually "boundless": day after day it supplies a region with approximately 5 million people and delivers goods to almost every European country.

== Location ==
The Wholesale Market is located on the border of the Munich boroughs of Sendling and Ludwigsvorstadt-Isarvorstadt. The Mittlerer Ring, Munich's inner-city orbital road system, runs south of the market premises, allowing easy access for cars and delivery trucks. The nearest Munich U-Bahn stations are Brudermühlstraße to the south-west, Implerstraße to the west and Poccistraße to the north-west. Bus 152 also runs from Implerstraße directly to the Wholesale Market.

== Market facilities ==
The main entrance of the Wholesalemarket Munich is situated directly opposite to the Heizkraftwerk Süd сombined heat and power station. Its three very tall chimneys are easy to see protruding into the Munich skyline. The adjoining "South Station" with its own track infrastructure and modern unloading equipment provides an optimal and reliable connection to the railway system. Munich is an advance border entrance point, which means all import/export formalities can be transacted easily within the branch offices of the public authorities.

== Opening and operational hours ==
- Parking area for trucks: Parking availability for delivery trucks is "around the clock" from Monday to Sunday, 24 hours a day; Freight handling activities: Monday through Friday, 4:00 am to 8:00 pm; Saturday, 6:00 am to 2:00 pm
- Freight handling halls (UGM I, II, III): Monday through Friday, 2:00 am to 8:00 pm, Saturday, 6:00 am to 2:00 pm
- Customs clearance: Monday through Thursday, 5:00 am to 4:00 pm, Friday, 5:00 am to 2:30 pm, Saturday, 8:00 am to 12:00 pm; beyond the regular customs service hours, customs clearance can carried out after making a previous agreement with the Papp forwarding agency
- Sales hours in the Wholesale Market Munich: Monday through Thursday, 5:30 am to 1:00 pm, Friday, 5:30 am to 2:00 pm
