= Machtlfinger Straße station =

Station of the Munich U-Bahn

Coordinates: 48°05′50″N 11°30′53″E

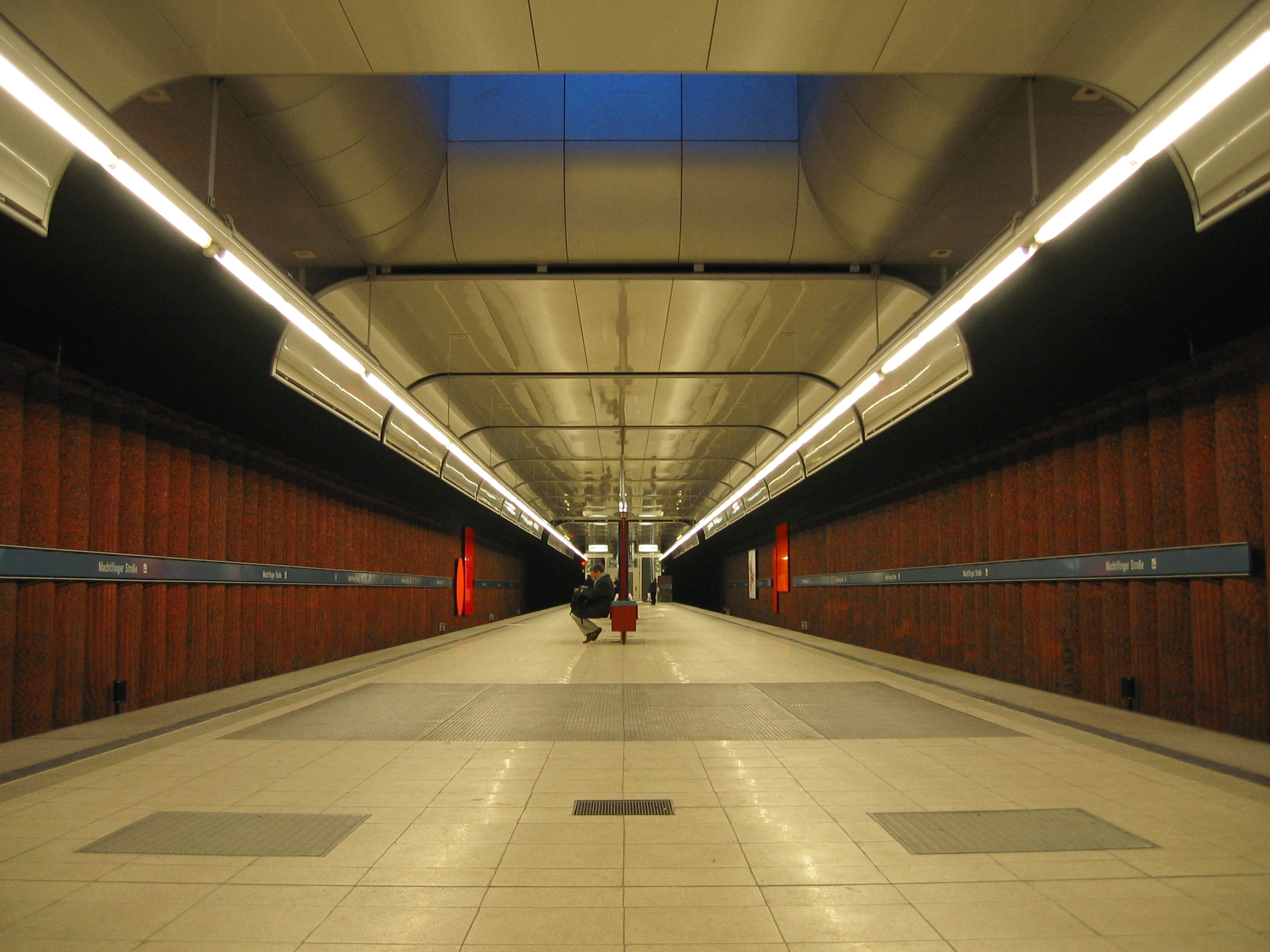
Machtlfinger Straße U-Bahn station

Machtlfinger Straße is an U-Bahn station in Munich on the U3.

Preceding station	Munich U-Bahn	Following station
Forstenrieder Allee towards Fürstenried West	U3	Aidenbachstraße towards Moosach
