= Forstenrieder Allee station =

Station of the Munich U-Bahn

Forstenrieder Allee
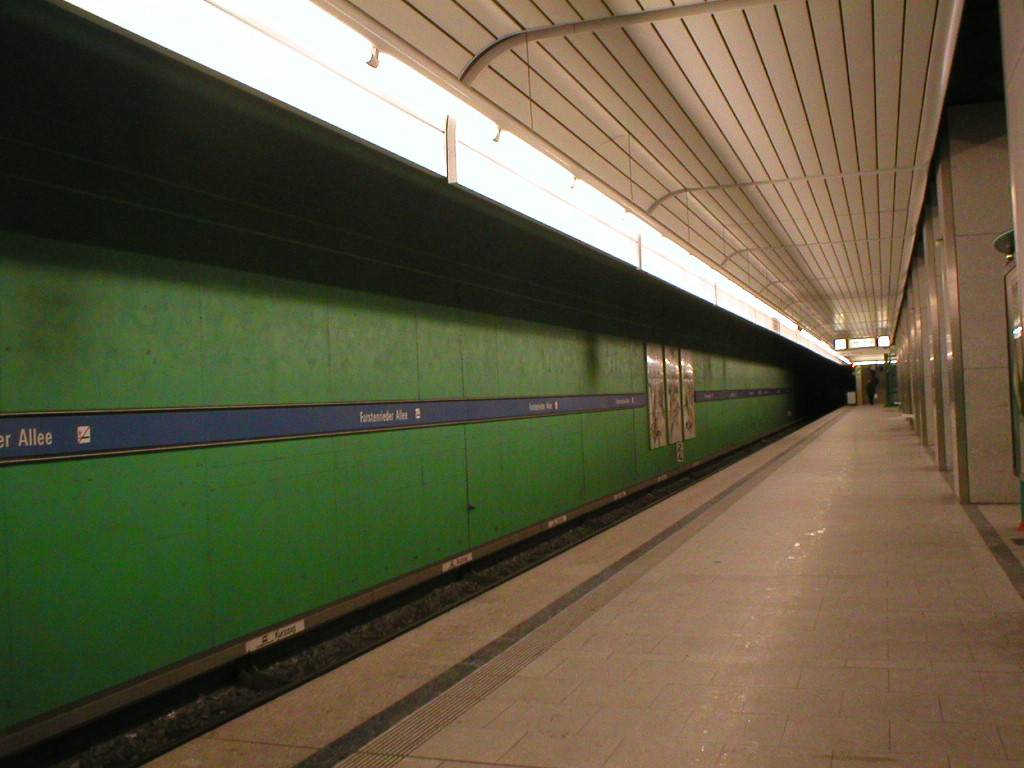

General information
- Location: Forstenried; Munich, Germany
- Coordinates: 48°05′42″N 11°29′58″E
- Platforms: Island platform
- Tracks: 2

Construction
- Structure type: Underground
- Cycle facilities: Yes
- Accessible: Yes

Other information
- Fare zone: : M and 1

History
- Opened: 28 October 1989

Services
Preceding station	Munich U-Bahn	Following station
Basler Straße towards Fürstenried West	U3	Machtlfinger Straße towards Moosach
Location

Forstenrieder Allee is an U-Bahn station in Munich, Germany on the U3. It is located under Züricher Straße at Forstenrieder Allee. Before the extension of the U3 to Fürstenried West in 1991, it was the southern end station for the line. The station is accessible via six entrances, two located at the east end of the station and four at the west.

== Surroundings ==
The commercial center of Forstenried, along with a public library and a civil office, is built around the station. The München Folk high school is also situated nearby.
