= Munich U-Bahn =

Rapid transit railway in Germany

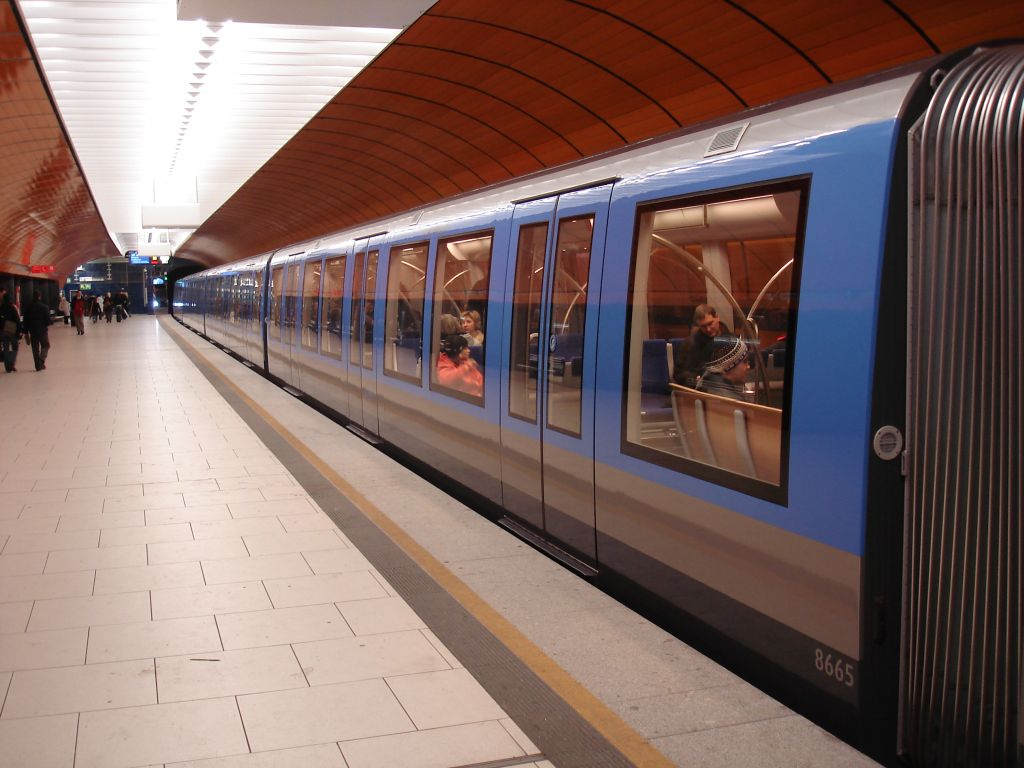
- A Munich U-Bahn train at a station

Overview
- Locale: Munich
- Transit type: Rapid transit
- Number of lines: 8
- Number of stations: 96 (Note: There are 100 stations according to the official source, which counts connecting/transfer stations twice; thus there are 96 stations when each station is counted once.)
- Daily ridership: 1,238,000 (2024)
- Annual ridership: 452 million (2024)
- Website: www.mvg.de

Operation
- Began operation: 19 October 1971; 55 years ago
- Operator: Münchner Verkehrsgesellschaft
- Number of vehicles: 117

Technical
- System length: 95 km (59 mi)
- Track gauge: 1,435 mm (4 ft 8 1/2 in) standard gauge
- Electrification: 750 V DC third rail
- Average speed: 35.5 km/h (22.1 mph)
System map
Munich U-Bahn network map

The Munich U-Bahn (U-Bahn München) is an electric rapid transit network in Munich, Germany. The system opened on 19 October 1971, and is operated by the municipally owned Münchner Verkehrsgesellschaft (MVG). It is part of the Münchner Verkehrs- und Tarifverbund (MVV; Munich Transport and Tariff Association) and is interconnected with the Munich S-Bahn.

Together with the S-Bahn, the U-Bahn forms a major component of Munich's local public transport. The network consists of eight lines, serving 96 stations (100 when interchange stations with separate levels are counted twice) and extending over 95 kilometres (59 mi) of track.

In 2024, the system carried 452 million passengers.

== Lines ==
The Munich U-Bahn operates eight lines.

Line	From	Via	To
U1	Olympia-Einkaufszentrum station	Westfriedhof station – Hauptbahnhof – Sendlinger Tor station – Kolumbusplatz station	Mangfallplatz station
U2	Feldmoching station	Scheidplatz station – Hauptbahnhof – Sendlinger Tor station – Kolumbusplatz station – Giesing – Innsbrucker Ring station	Messestadt Ost station
U3	Moosach	Olympiazentrum station – Scheidplatz station – Münchner Freiheit station – Odeonsplatz station – Marienplatz – Sendlinger Tor station – Implerstraße station	Fürstenried West station
U4	Westendstraße station	Heimeranplatz station – Hauptbahnhof – Karlsplatz (Stachus) – Odeonsplatz station – Lehel station – Max-Weber-Platz station	Arabellapark station
U5	Laimer Platz station	Westendstraße station – Hauptbahnhof – Karlsplatz (Stachus) – Odeonsplatz station – Max-Weber-Platz station – Ostbahnhof – Innsbrucker Ring station	Neuperlach Süd station
U6	Garching-Forschungszentrum station	Fröttmaning station – Freimann station – Studentenstadt station – Münchner Freiheit station – Odeonsplatz station – Marienplatz – Sendlinger Tor station – Implerstraße station – Harras	Klinikum Großhadern station
U7	Olympia-Einkaufszentrum station	Westfriedhof station – Rotkreuzplatz station – Hauptbahnhof – Sendlinger Tor station – Kolumbusplatz station – Giesing – Innsbrucker Ring station	Neuperlach Zentrum station
U8	Olympiazentrum station	Scheidplatz station – Hauptbahnhof – Sendlinger Tor station – Kolumbusplatz station – Giesing – Innsbrucker Ring station	Neuperlach Zentrum station

The network covers 95 km (59 mi) of track and has 100 stations. In 2024, it carried 452 million passengers. Trains run at up to 80 km/h (50 mph), the fastest speed of any German U-Bahn.

Service stops overnight (01:00–04:00 on weekdays, 02:00–04:00 on weekends), except on occasions such as New Year's Eve.

Line U6 is the only line that leaves Munich, running north to Garching. All others stay underground within the city. U5 comes above ground at Neuperlach Süd. U6 is above ground between Studentenstadt and Garching, with short tunnels at Garching and Garching-Forschungszentrum.

Three line pairs share tracks in the city centre, with coordinated timetables:

- U1 and U2
- U3 and U6
- U4 and U5

Most stations have two tracks with an island platform. Stations with side platforms are: Olympia-Einkaufszentrum (U1), Richard-Strauss-Straße (U4), Neuperlach Süd (U5), Garching-Hochbrück, and Nordfriedhof (both U6).

Some stations are larger:

- Scheidplatz and Innsbrucker Ring – four tracks with two island platforms for cross-platform interchange
- Hauptbahnhof (U1/U2) and Münchner Freiheit (U3/U6) – four tracks on one level
- Implerstraße (U3/U6), Max-Weber-Platz (U4/U5), Kolumbusplatz (U1/U2) – three tracks (one side, one island)
- Olympiazentrum, Fröttmaning, and Kieferngarten – four tracks each; Olympiazentrum for the Olympic Park, Fröttmaning and Kieferngarten for the depot and the Allianz Arena

At Hauptbahnhof, lines U4 and U5 use a separate station at a higher level, giving a total of six tracks. Sendlinger Tor, Odeonsplatz, and Olympia-Einkaufszentrum also have two levels, connected by escalators and lifts.

=== Frequency and scheduling ===
- Peak hours: every 5 minutes, as often as every 2 minutes where lines overlap.
- Off-peak: every 10 minutes.
- Early mornings and late evenings: every 20 minutes or more, though overlapping lines often reduce waiting times.

=== U1 ===
Line	Route	
U1	Olympia-Einkaufszentrum – Georg-Brauchle-Ring – Westfriedhof – Gern – Rotkreuzplatz – Maillingerstraße – Stiglmaierplatz – Hauptbahnhof – Sendlinger Tor – Fraunhoferstraße – Kolumbusplatz – Candidplatz – Wettersteinplatz – St.-Quirin-Platz – Mangfallplatz	Olympia-Einkaufszentrum – Mangfallplatz

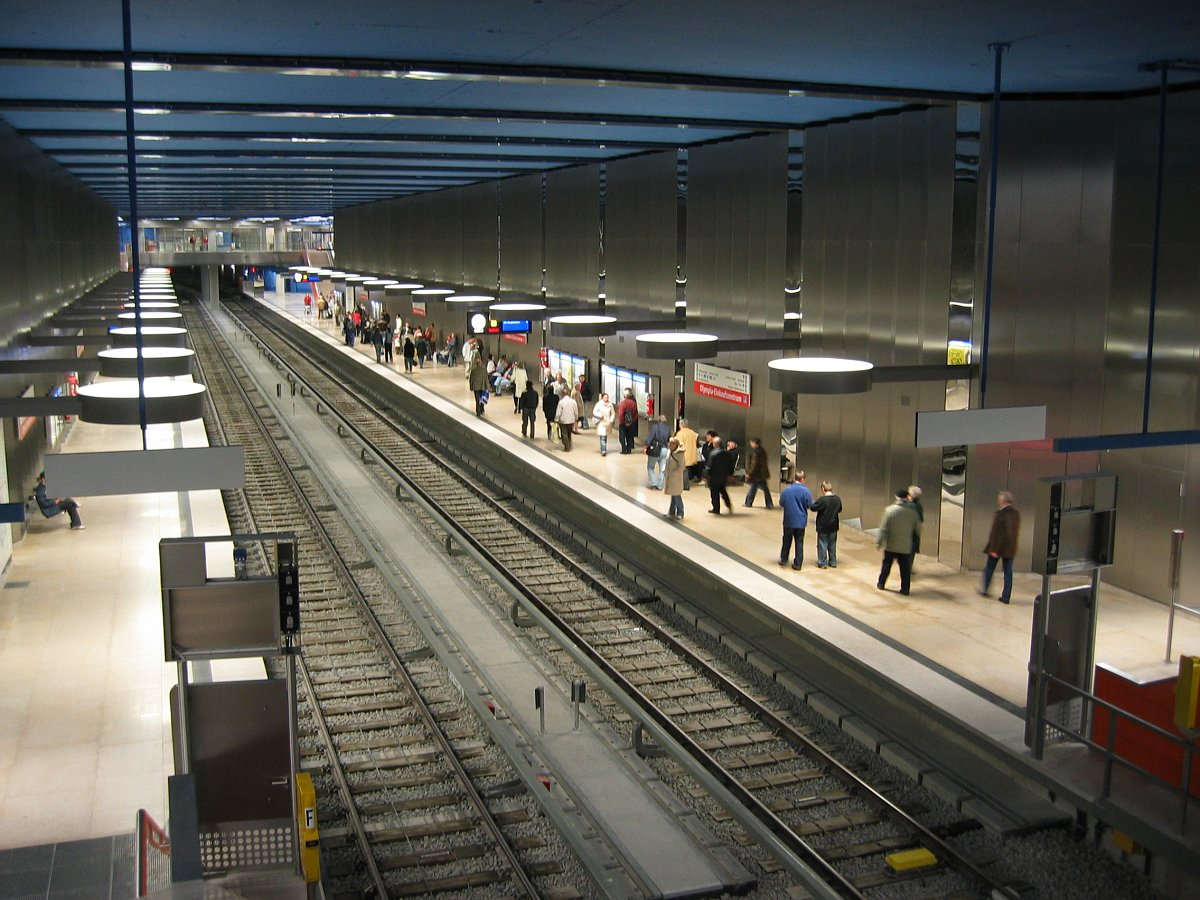
Olympia-Einkaufszentrum station, northern terminus of line U1

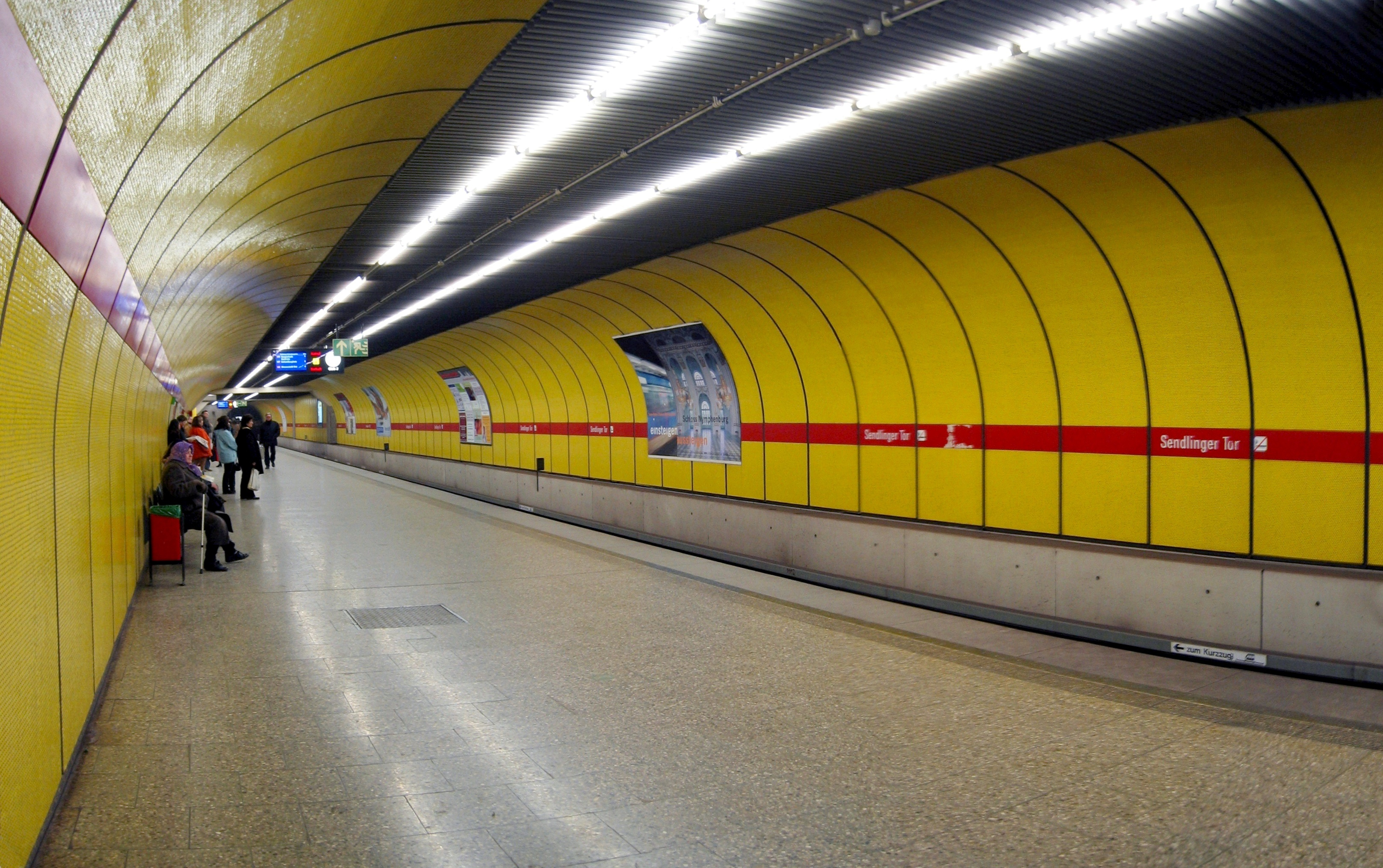
Sendlinger Tor station, served by lines U1 and U2

Line U1 opened in 1980 together with the former U8 (now U2). Initially it operated on part of the U2 route, but became a separate line after the branch to Rotkreuzplatz was completed.

Today the line is 12.2 km (7.6 mi) long and serves 15 stations. It runs from Olympia-Einkaufszentrum in Moosach, where line U3 also terminates on a different level, to Mangfallplatz in the south. The line colour is green.

From Olympia-Einkaufszentrum the line runs along Hanauer Straße to Georg-Brauchle-Ring, designed by artist Franz Ackermann, and continues via Westfriedhof, Gern, and Rotkreuzplatz, which was the terminus from 1983 to 1998. It then proceeds beneath Nymphenburger Straße to Maillingerstraße and Stiglmaierplatz before joining the U2 at Hauptbahnhof.

On the busy city section, U1 and U2 run with coordinated 5-minute intervals. At Hauptbahnhof, interchange to all S-Bahn lines and lines U4/U5 is available.

South of Hauptbahnhof, U1 continues to Sendlinger Tor, where the U1/U2 platforms are located in separate tunnels linked by a pedestrian passage. At Fraunhoferstraße, close to the Isar, large support pillars define the station's design. At Kolumbusplatz, U1 branches off from U2.

The southern extension opened in 1997. It includes Candidplatz, Wettersteinplatz, and St.-Quirin-Platz, the last of which has a glass-and-steel shell roof that extends nearly to track level. The line terminates at Mangfallplatz beneath Naupliastraße.

=== U2 ===
Line	Route
U2	Feldmoching – Hasenbergl – Dülferstraße – Harthof – Am Hart – Frankfurter Ring – Milbertshofen – Scheidplatz – Hohenzollernplatz – Josephsplatz – Theresienstraße – Königsplatz – Hauptbahnhof – Sendlinger Tor – Fraunhoferstraße – Kolumbusplatz – Silberhornstraße – Untersbergstraße – Giesing – Karl-Preis-Platz – Innsbrucker Ring – Josephsburg – Kreillerstraße – Trudering – Moosfeld – Messestadt West – Messestadt Ost

The route of the U2 line has undergone more changes than any of the other Munich underground lines. It also changed its name as it was first called U8. It is the only line that runs or ran on all three "line families" (U1/U2, U3/U6 and U4/U5). Today it has a length of 24.4 km (15.2 mi) and 27 stations. The line's colour is red.

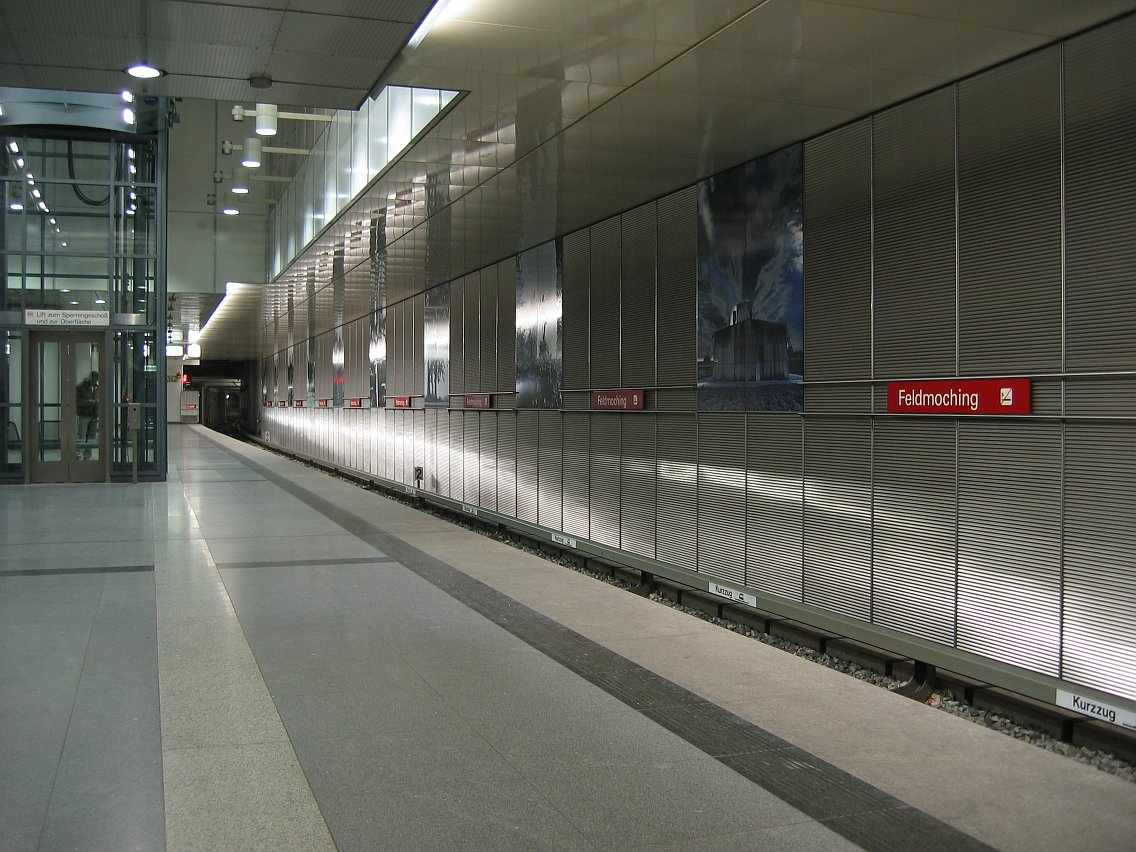
Feldmoching

Dülferstraße

The U2 starts in the north at Feldmoching, where it connects to the S1 to Freising/Airport. The station there is decorated with rural and urban motives of Feldmoching's history. Below Hasenbergl, a district which had been known for its social problems, it goes to Dülferstraße, which provides access to the eastern Hasenbergl and a newly built area on Panzerwiese. Dülferstraße was the terminus from 1993 till 1996.

Via the stations Harthof and Am Hart, the U2 reaches Frankfurter Ring. In the tunnel between Am Hart and Frankfurter Ring, there is a white and blue wave pattern, which is the only installation of art in a Munich U-Bahn tunnel outside of stations.

After Milbertshofen station the U2 touches the U3 line at Scheidplatz, where cross-platform interchange is possible. Before the opening of the section to Dülferstraße in 1993, U2 went from Scheidplatz to Olympiazentrum, sharing the track with the U3. Through the district of Maxvorstadt the U2 continues to downtown Munich, reaching the stations Hohenzollernplatz, Josephsplatz, Theresienstraße und Königsplatz. At Königsplatz one can find artworks from the nearby Glyptothek on the platform.

At München Hauptbahnhof (Munich Central Station), the U2 meets the U1, with which it shares tracks until Kolumbusplatz (see above).

After Kolumbusplatz the U2 continues eastward and reaches the stations Silberhornstraße, Untersbergstraße and Giesing station, with an interchange possibility to S3 and S7. The next stations are Karl-Preis-Platz and Innsbrucker Ring, where cross-platform interchange to the U5 is possible. Until 1999, when the branch to the Messestadt stations was opened, the U2 ran from here to Neuperlach.

Via the stations Josephsburg and Kreillerstraße the U2 reaches Trudering, which features two platforms in separate tunnels, connected by two transversal tunnels. In 1994, during the construction of this section, an accident happened: the ceiling of the new tunnel collapsed due to the intrusion of water and a bus fell into the crater. Two passengers and one construction worker died and the construction was delayed.

Via Moosfeld, the U2 reaches Messestadt West and its terminus Messestadt Ost. These stations are located between the fairgrounds (Messestadt) in the north and a development area and the Bundesgartenschau 2005 in the south.

=== U3 ===
Line	Route
U3	Moosach – Moosacher St.-Martins-Platz – Olympia-Einkaufszentrum – Oberwiesenfeld – Olympiazentrum – Petuelring – Scheidplatz – Bonner Platz – Münchner Freiheit – Giselastraße – Universität – Odeonsplatz – Marienplatz – Sendlinger Tor – Goetheplatz – Poccistraße – Implerstraße – Brudermühlstraße – Thalkirchen – Obersendling – Aidenbachstraße – Machtlfinger Straße – Forstenrieder Allee – Basler Straße – Fürstenried West

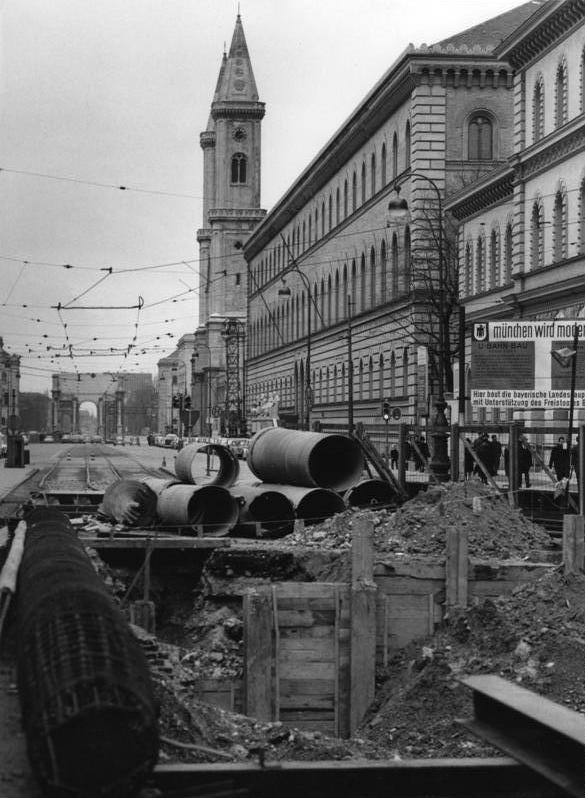
Munich underground construction near Siegestor, 1967

Oberwiesenfeld platform

The U3 is the original Olympic line; the first section was opened for the Olympic Summer Games 1972. Today the line has a total of length of 21.2 km (13.2 mi) and 25 stations. The line's colour is orange.

Today the U3 starts in the north at Moosach, Munich's 100th U-Bahn station, where passengers can change to the S1 to Freising/Airport. From here the line runs east to Moosacher St.-Martins-Platz and Olympia-Einkaufszentrum, where a change to the U1 is possible. After passing through Oberwiesenfeld station, the U3 reaches its original northern terminus at Olympiazentrum. From 1972 until 2007, this station was the end of the original Olympic line.

When Munich was awarded the Olympic Summer Games 1972 in 1965, the U-Bahn network concept (which was adopted only one year earlier) had to be revised to speed up the construction of a connection to the Olympic venues at Olympic grounds. The Olympic connector (now U3) was redesigned as a branch of the U6 line, because the original plan of a direct connection to the Olympic ground from Munich Central Station was not feasible in the new timeframe. This original U3 sections consists of four stations (from north to south): Olympiazentrum, Petuelring, Scheidplatz, where cross-platform interchange to the U2 (the line originally supposed to serve the Olympic venues) is possible since 1980, and Bonner Platz. After Bonner Platz the U3 reaches Münchner Freiheit, where it joins the U6 to run together through the inner city section to Implerstraße (for this section see U6 below).

After leaving the three-track junction station Implerstraße, where the U6 heads west towards Harras before ending up in Großhadern suburb, the U3 reaches Brudermühlstraße (near the picturesque Flaucher section of the Isar river), Thalkirchen (Zoo) (a short walk from the large city zoo) and Obersendling, which is built 30 metres (98 ft) higher than the Thalkirchen station, because it is located on the "Hochufer" (western tread) of the River Isar. Here, interchange to the S-Bahn at Siemenswerke station is possible. The U3 continues west via Aidenbachstraße and Machtlfinger Straße, before reaching Forstenrieder Allee, Basler Straße, and eventually the terminus Fürstenried West. This southern-eastern section was opened on 28 October 1989, as can be seen from huge date numbers on the western entrance of Obersendling station.

=== U4 ===
Line	Route
U4	Westendstraße – Heimeranplatz – Schwanthalerhöhe – Theresienwiese – Hauptbahnhof – Karlsplatz (Stachus) – Odeonsplatz – Lehel – Max-Weber-Platz – Prinzregentenplatz – Böhmerwaldplatz – Richard-Strauss-Straße – Arabellapark

With only 9.2 km (5.7 mi) and 13 stations, the U4 is Munich's shortest U-Bahn line. This line has originally been planned as U9 and is the only line that operates regularly with 4-car sets rather than the full 6-car set. The exceptions are Fridays in the late afternoon and during the Oktoberfest. The line's colour is mint green.

The U4 begins in the west in the Laim neighbourhood at Westendstraße station, which it shares with the U5 line. Both U4 and U5 are the only lines of a joint line "family", which only branch out on one end of the common line, as an originally planned western extension of the U4 was first put on hold and was subsequently cancelled altogether.

From Westendstraße the U4 runs east to Heimeranplatz, which connects to S7 and S20 S-Bahn lines. The next two stations, Schwanthalerhöhe (originally called Messegelände, the German for "exhibition grounds"; the name was changed when the exhibition centre relocated to Riem in 1998) and Theresienwiese, are gateways to the Oktoberfest, and are therefore highly loaded during this event. Between both aforementioned stations, there is a track that links to Implerstraße to provide a connection to the depot in Fröttmaning.

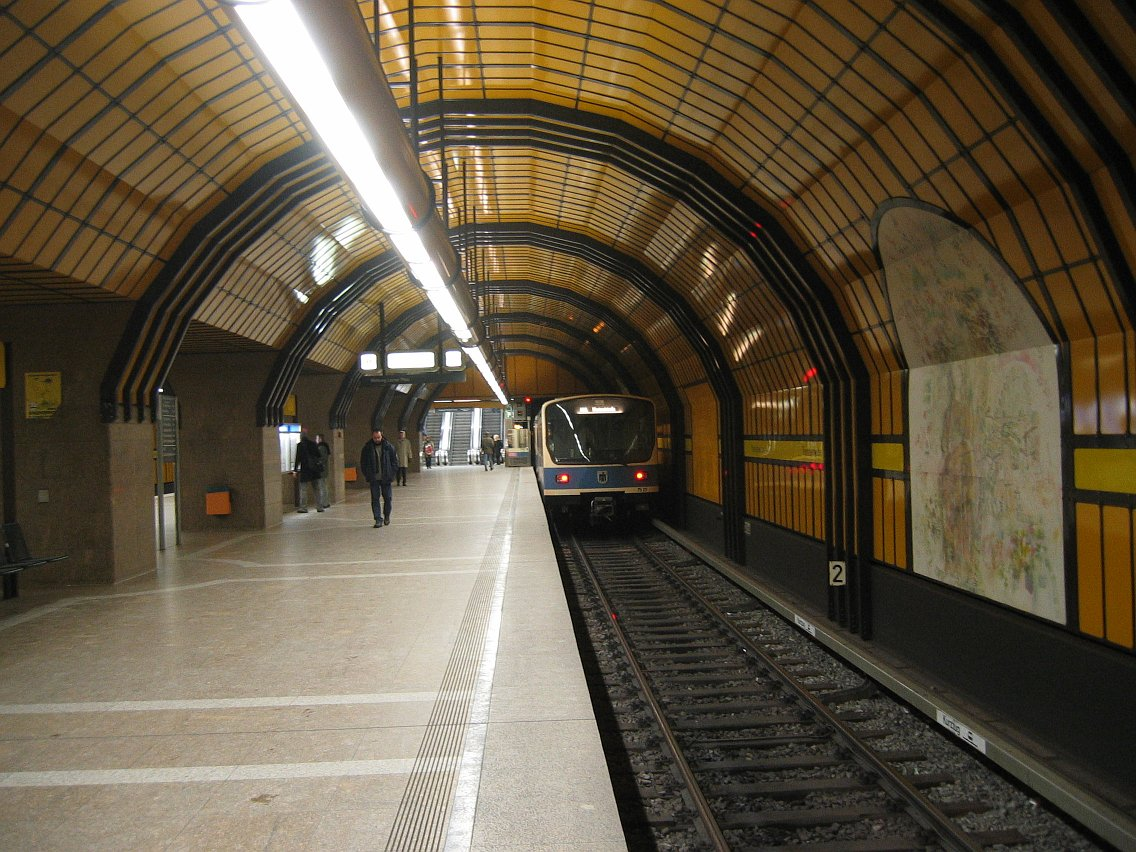
Theresienwiese

Theresienwiese is one of only two U-Bahn stations in Munich (besides Fröttmaning station which serves Allianz Arena) to have the command centre booth opened during the Oktoberfest for supervising the masses of passengers. The southern exit of the station leads to the northern entrance of Oktoberfest. U4 trains arriving from the east often terminate at Theresienwiese rather than continue to Westendstraße even during peak hours due to low traffic volume east of Hauptbahnhof.

After Theresienwiese the U4 reaches München Hauptbahnhof (Munich Central Station); passengers can transfer to U1/U2 lines as well as to all S-Bahn lines (except S20) here. The next station is Karlsplatz (Stachus) with shorter and easier connections to S-Bahn (S1 to S8). Karlsplatz is the deepest station in Munich's U-Bahn network (36 metres (118 ft) below the surface). From this point on, the U4 runs north of the S-Bahn cross-city tunnel.

After passing Odeonsplatz, where an interchange to U3/U6 trains is possible, and Lehel, the U4 crosses the River Isar in a tunnel, and reaches Max-Weber-Platz, the last station that is shared with the U5. Here, the U4 branches off to the north, while the U5 runs south.

Before terminating at Arabellapark, the U4 passes the stations Prinzregentenplatz, Böhmerwaldplatz, and Richard-Strauss-Straße, the latter being the only station of the line to be equipped with side platforms instead of an island platform.

The original plan called for an extension to Johanneskirchen station (where easy transfer to the S8 S-Bahn line would be possible) via Fideliopark, but was never built, due to low current ridership in the area north of Max-Weber-Platz. The extension of the tram line in the area in 2011 made the plan even more unlikely to materialise. A possible extension in the west to Blumenau is even more improbable.

In the evenings from around 20.40 to the close of operations, the U4 only operates between Odeonsplatz and Arabellapark.

=== U5 ===
Line	Route
U5	Laimer Platz – Friedenheimer Straße – Westendstraße – Heimeranplatz – Schwanthalerhöhe – Theresienwiese – Hauptbahnhof – Karlsplatz (Stachus) – Odeonsplatz – Lehel – Max-Weber-Platz – Ostbahnhof – Innsbrucker Ring – Michaelibad – Quiddestraße – Neuperlach Zentrum – Therese-Giehse-Allee – Neuperlach Süd

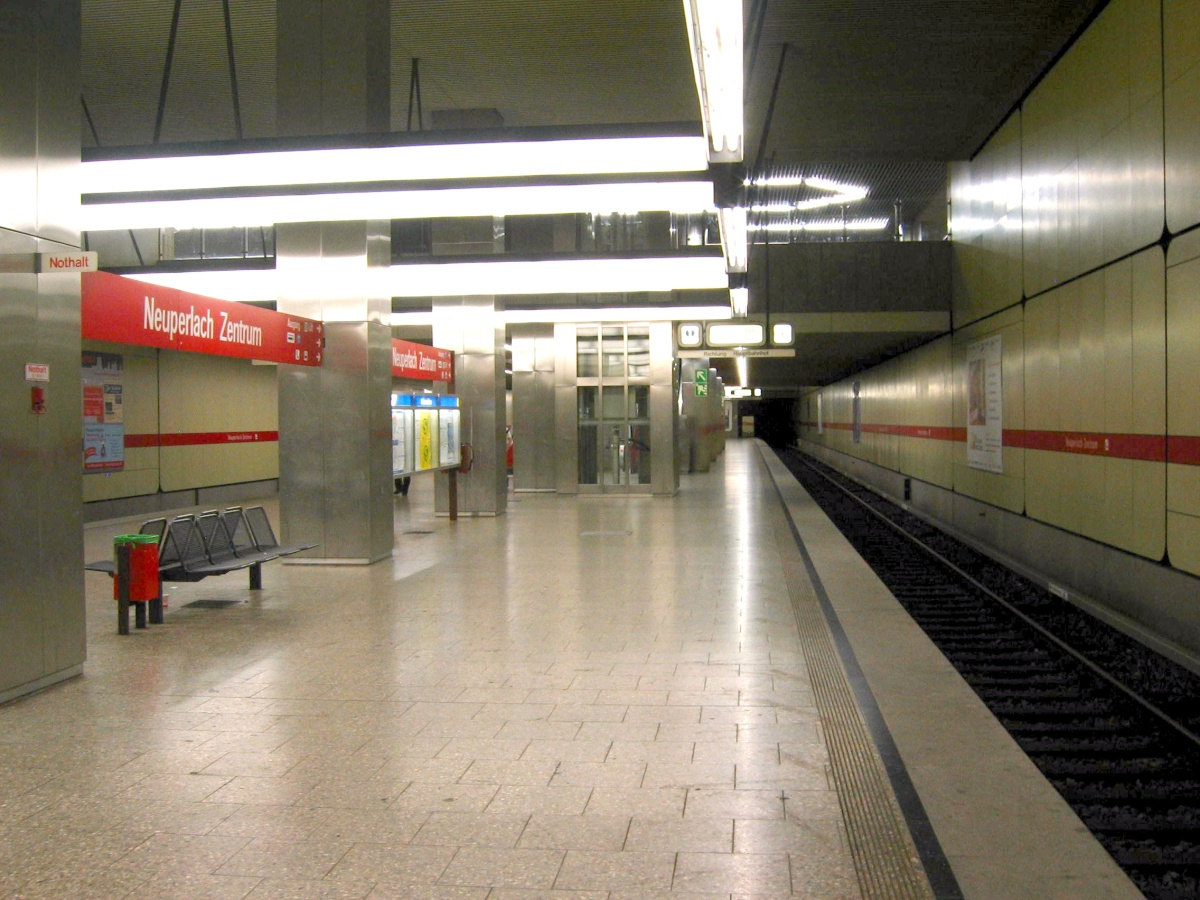
Neuperlach Zentrum

The U5 currently begins at Laimer Platz; an extension to Pasing is under construction. The total length currently is 15.4 km (9.6 mi). The line's colour is brown.

Via Friedenheimer Straße, the U5 reaches Westendstraße. From there, the U5 shares the tracks with the U4 to Max-Weber-Platz (see above).

At Max-Weber-Platz, the U5 branches off to the south to Ostbahnhof (East Station), where changing to all S-Bahn lines is possible. The next station, Innsbrucker Ring, allows cross-platform interchange to the U2.

The U5 continues south to Michaelibad, Quiddestraße, and Neuperlach Zentrum, which is the centre of the satellite town of Neuperlach, built during the 1960s and 1970s. Going on to Therese-Giehse-Allee, the U5 comes above ground and reaches its terminus Neuperlach Süd, where it allows cross-platform interchange with S-Bahn line S7. South-east of Neuperlach-Süd is a large parking yard (Betriebsanlage Süd) used to park trains which can't be parked at the technical base in Fröttmaning or within the network.

=== U6 ===
Line	Route
U6	Garching-Forschungszentrum – Garching – Garching-Hochbrück – Fröttmaning – Kieferngarten – Freimann – Studentenstadt – Alte Heide – Nordfriedhof – Dietlindenstraße – Münchner Freiheit – Giselastraße – Universität – Odeonsplatz – Marienplatz – Sendlinger Tor – Goetheplatz – Poccistraße – Implerstraße – Harras – Partnachplatz – Westpark – Holzapfelkreuth – Haderner Stern – Großhadern – Klinikum Großhadern

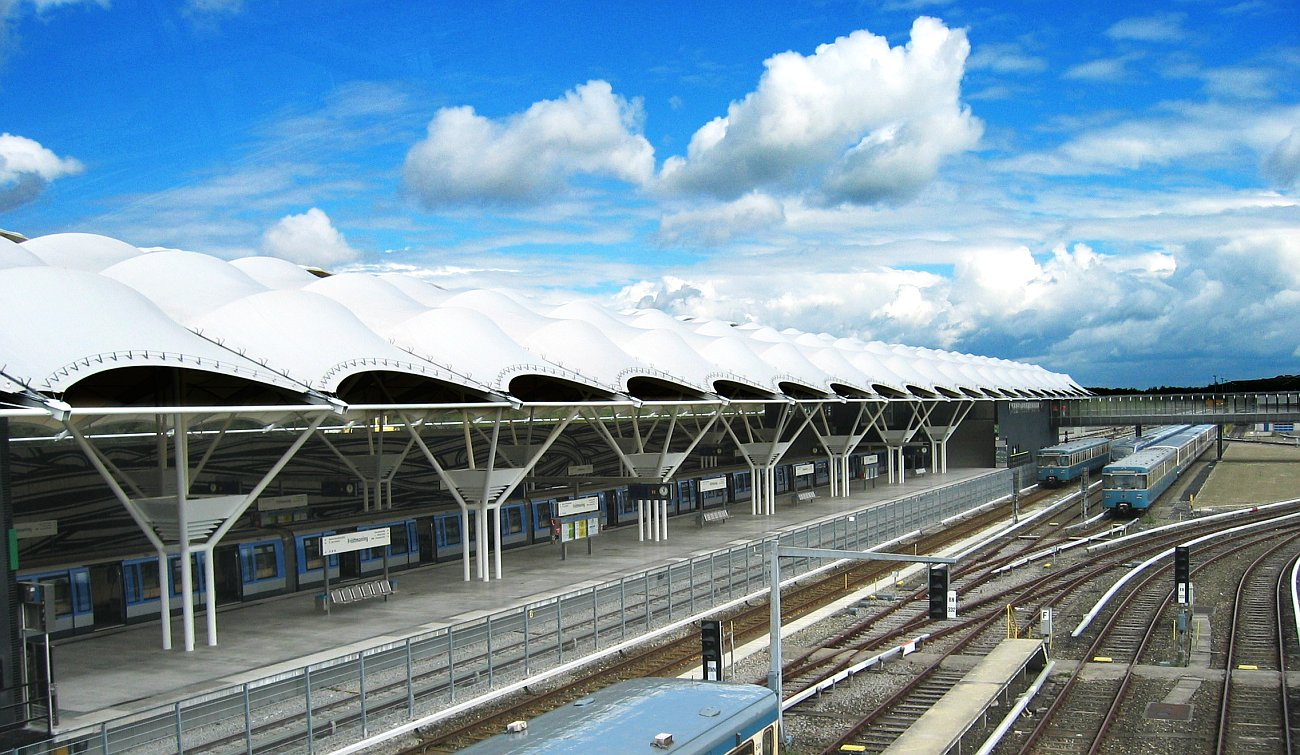
Fröttmaning

Garching

Großhadern

The U6 is the oldest U-Bahn line of the network and also features the oldest tunnel built: the section below the Lindwurmstraße (between Sendlinger Tor and including the station Goetheplatz) was already built 1938–1941 as part of a planned S-Bahn network. For this reason Goetheplatz has a platform longer than the standard 120 metres (393 ft 8 in). Today the line has a length of 27.4 km (17.0 mi). Its colour is blue.

Since 2006 the northern terminus of the U6 is Garching-Forschungszentrum; via Garching it reaches Garching-Hochbrück. These three stations are outside the city limits of Munich in the city of Garching.

The distance of 4.1 km (2.5 mi) to the next station at Fröttmaning is the longest distance between two stations in Munich's U-Bahn network. Fröttmaning has been expanded to two island platforms and four tracks to cater for the Allianz Arena football stadium, built for the 2006 FIFA World Cup. The technical base of the U-Bahn is located at Fröttmaning, too. After passing Kieferngarten station, which has two island platforms as well, it crosses over a rail bridge to Freimann and Studentenstadt. Between these two stations is a connection to mainline railway tracks, which is used to bring new trains into the network. The bridge was originally used by the tram and was the only tram track to be converted to be part of the U-Bahn network. The U6 then continues underground for the rest of its way south.

Via Alte Heide, Nordfriedhof (station with side platforms), and Dietlindenstraße, the U6 reaches Münchner Freiheit, where it joins the U3 on the shared inner city tunnel.

Passing Giselastraße and Universität (University), it arrives at Odeonsplatz, where it connects to the U4/U5 lines. Continuing to Marienplatz, it crosses the S-Bahn lines. During peak hours this station is can get overcrowded, which is why additional pedestrian tunnels were built between 2003 and 2006.

At Sendlinger Tor the U3/U6 crosses the U1/U2 line, and interchange is possible. The line now uses the tunnel built in 1941 mentioned above as far as Goetheplatz. The next station, Poccistraße was added belatedly, constructed between the two existing tunnels which stayed operational. At Implerstraße the U3 and U6 separate again. To the north of the station, facing north, there is a branch to the U4/U5 at Schwanthalerhöhe, which is not used for passenger transport.

At Harras the U6 connects to the S-Bahn lines S7 and S20, and to regional trains to the south. The section via Partnachplatz and Westpark to Holzapfelkreuth was constructed for the Internationale Gartenbauausstellung (IGA) in 1983 was therefore dubbed "flower line", which is reflected in the design of these stations. Passing Haderner Stern and Großhadern, the U6 reaches its current southern terminus at Klinikum Großhadern, where the entrance to the station is covered by a glass pyramid.

An extension to Martinsried, approximately 1 km (0.62 mi) west of the current terminus, is under construction, and is supposed to open in 2027.

=== U7 ===
Line	Route
U7	Olympia-Einkaufszentrum – Georg-Brauchle-Ring – Westfriedhof – Gern – Rotkreuzplatz – Maillingerstraße – Stiglmaierplatz – Hauptbahnhof – Sendlinger Tor – Fraunhoferstraße – Kolumbusplatz – Silberhornstraße – Untersbergstraße – Giesing – Karl-Preis-Platz – Innsbrucker Ring – Michaelibad – Quiddestraße – Neuperlach Zentrum

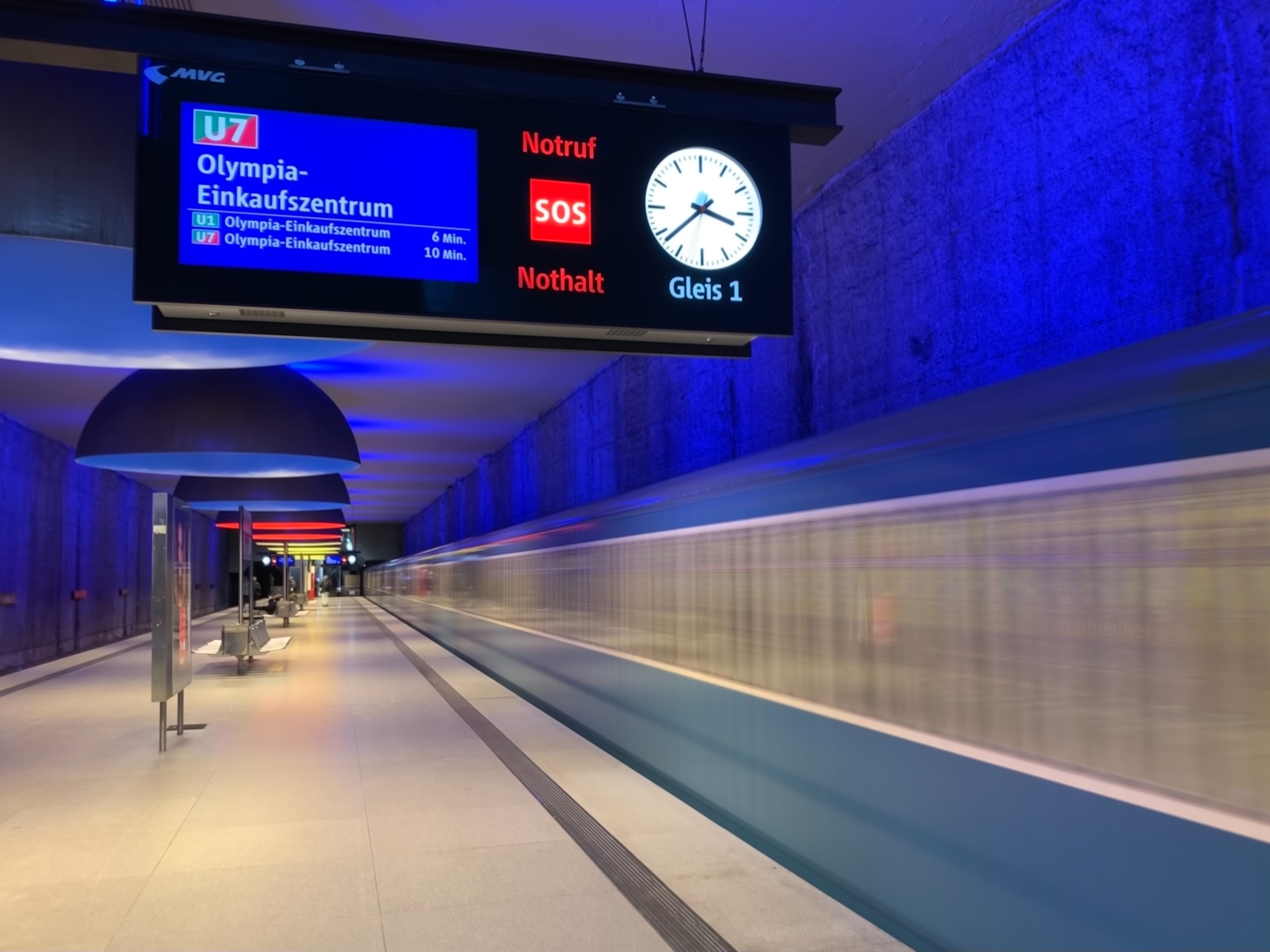
U7 departing from Westfriedhof station

This booster line (it only operates during rush hours) was added in December 2011 along with the new tram extension to St. Emmeram. The U7 runs between Olympia-Einkaufszentrum and Neuperlach Zentrum via München Hauptbahnhof and Innsbrucker Ring: it shares the tracks with the U1 from Olympia-Einkaufszentrum to Kolumbusplatz, the U2 from München Hauptbahnhof to Innsbrucker Ring, and the U5 from Innsbrucker Ring to its southern terminus Neuperlach Zentrum.

=== U8 ===
Line	Route
U8	Olympiazentrum – Petuelring – Scheidplatz – Hohenzollernplatz – Josephsplatz – Theresienstraße – Königsplatz – Hauptbahnhof – Sendlinger Tor – Fraunhoferstraße – Kolumbusplatz – Silberhornstraße – Untersbergstraße – Giesing – Karl-Preis-Platz – Innsbrucker Ring – Michaelibad – Quiddestraße – Neuperlach Zentrum

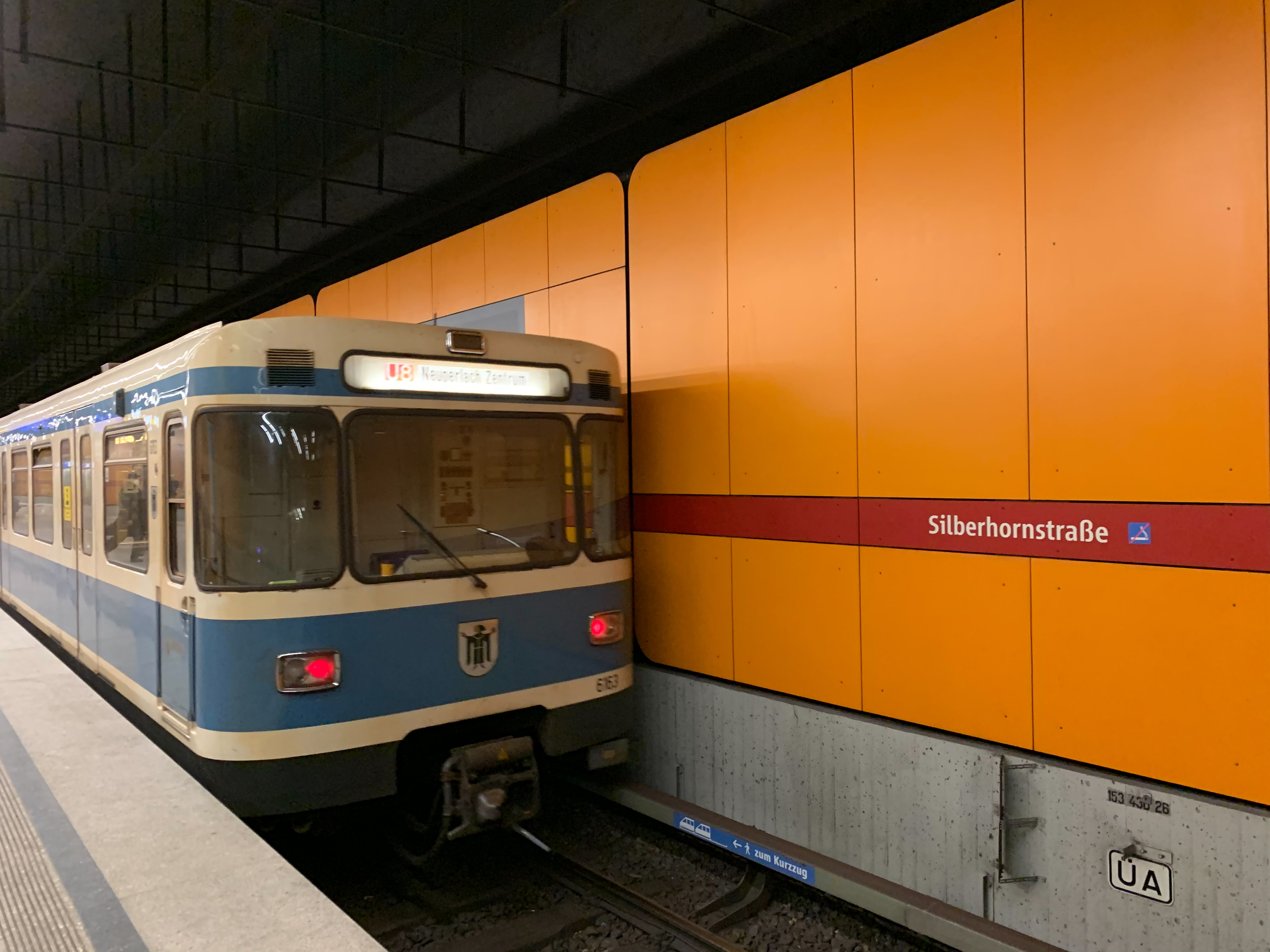
U8 train in Silberhornstraße

This booster line started operations in December 2013. It only operates on Saturday afternoons. The U8 begins in the north at Olympiazentrum and shares the tracks with the U3 as far as Scheidplatz, where it continues along the U2 tracks to Innsbrucker Ring and terminates at Neuperlach Zentrum. It is only running on Saturdays to ease crowding on the U2 and U3 lines, and to provide people an easier access to the Olympic Park from Munich Central Station.

== Rolling stock ==
The Munich U-Bahn operates three generations of electric multiple unit (EMU) trains. More than 550 carriages are in use across all lines.

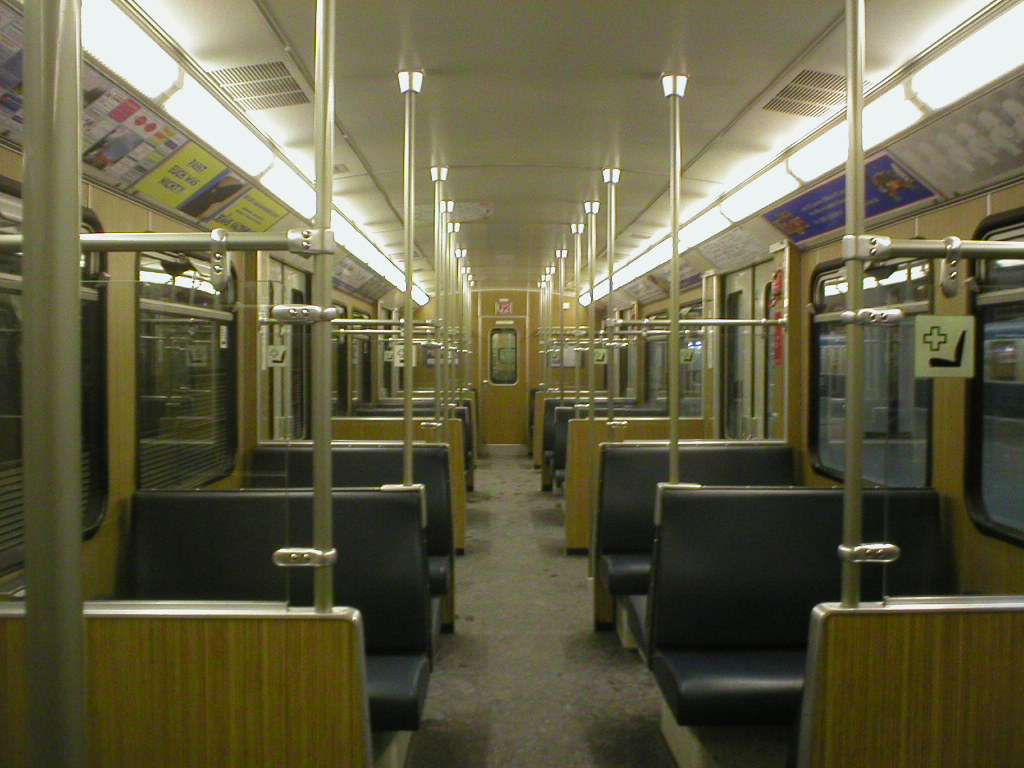
Interior of Class A train

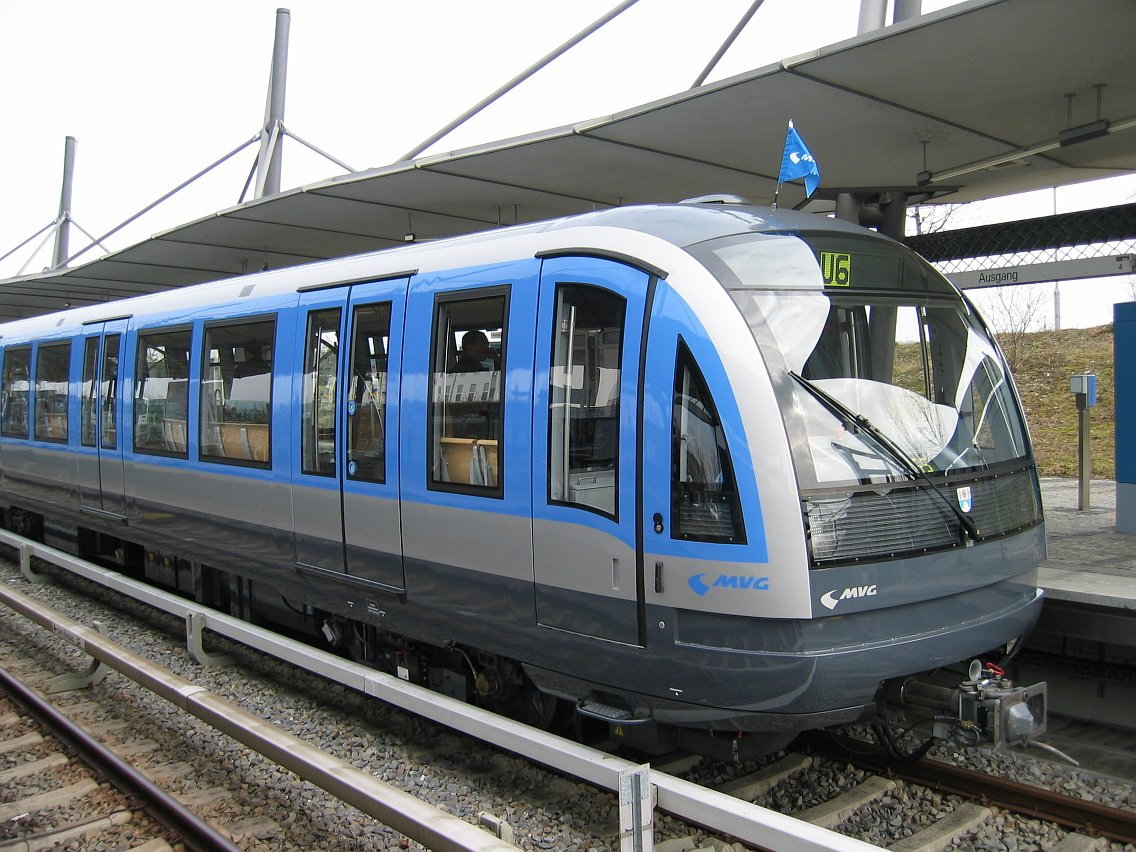
Class C1 train at Garching-Hochbrück

=== Summary ===
Class	Years built	Units delivered	Units in service	Formation	Notes
A	1967–1983	193	179	2-car units, up to 3 coupled	First generation; prototypes in 1967
B	1981–1994	63	57	2-car units, up to 3 coupled	Three-phase motors; not compatible with Class A
C1, C2	2002–present	85 (18 C1, 67 C2)	85	Continuous 6-car sets	Inspiro-based design with gangways

=== Class A ===
Class A units were built between 1967 (prototypes) and 1983. Each unit consists of two permanently coupled carriages, 37.15 m (121 ft 11 in) long and 2.90 m (9 ft 6 in) wide, with three doors per side. Capacity is 98 seats and standing room for 192 passengers.

A total of 193 units were delivered; 179 remain in service. Up to three units can be coupled to form a six-car "Langzug" (long train).

=== Class B ===
Class B units were introduced between 1981 and 1994 to expand capacity. Six prototypes were built before full production began. The trains have the same dimensions as Class A but feature:

- Redesigned cab and front window
- Three-phase motors instead of direct current
- Simplified door controls (one handle opens both leaves)

A total of 63 units were built; 57 remain in service. As with Class A, up to three B units can form a Langzug, but A and B units are not compatible for mixed operation.

=== Class C ===
Class C trains were developed in the late 1990s to replace aging Class A stock. Unlike earlier units, they are continuous six-car sets with gangways between all carriages.

- C1 series – Ten C1.9 sets (nos. 601–610) entered service in 2002, followed by eight C1.10 sets (nos. 611–618) in 2005 ahead of the 2006 FIFA World Cup. A total of 18 C1 sets are in use.
- C2 series – Based on the Siemens Inspiro. Ordered in 2010, with deliveries:
  - 21 sets (C2.11) – delivered 2018 (delayed from 2012)
  - 22 sets (C2.12) – delivered 2020–2022
  - 24 sets (C2.13) – delivered 2022–2024

In total, 67 C2 sets are in service or on order.

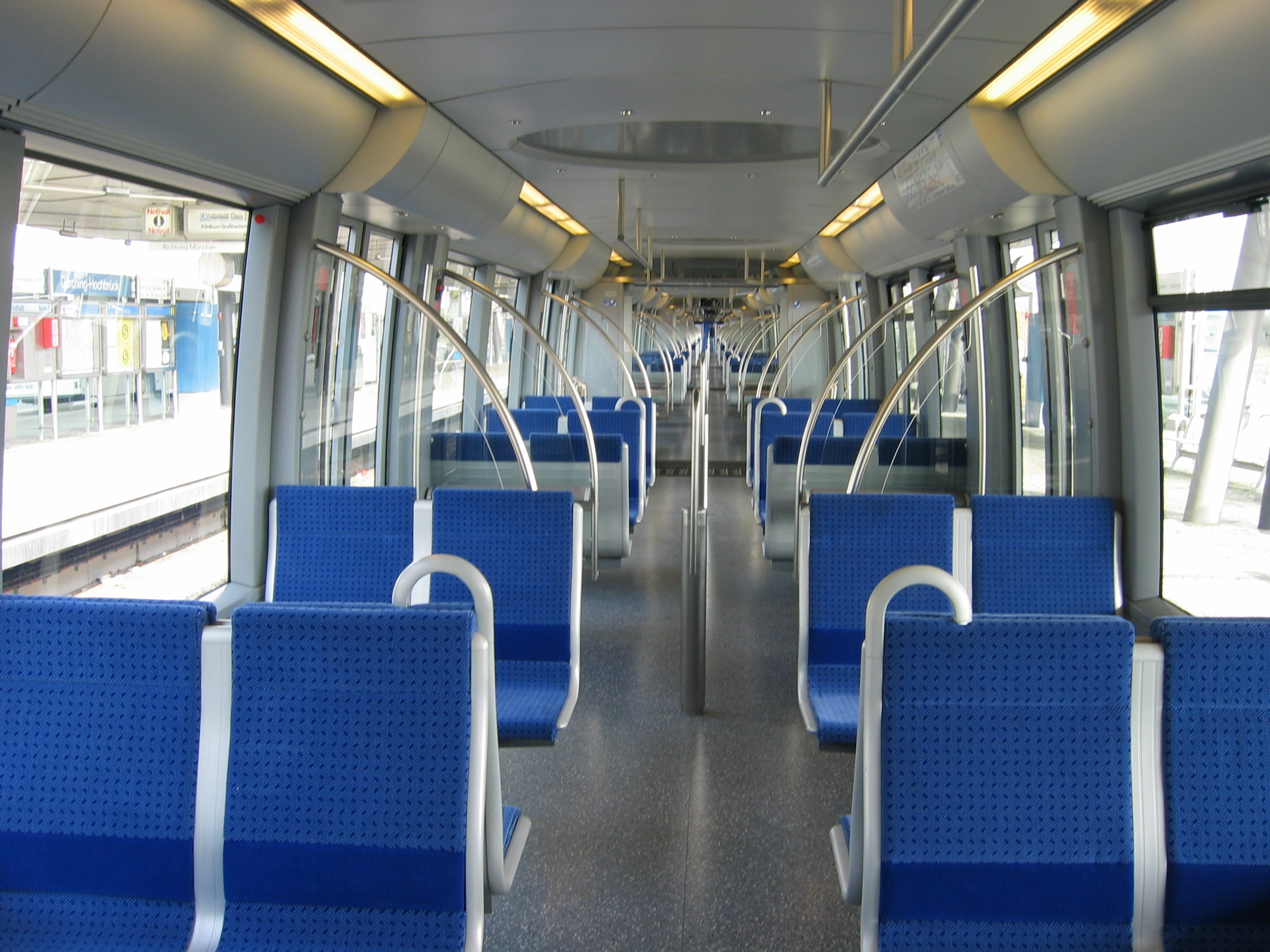
Interior of Class C1 train

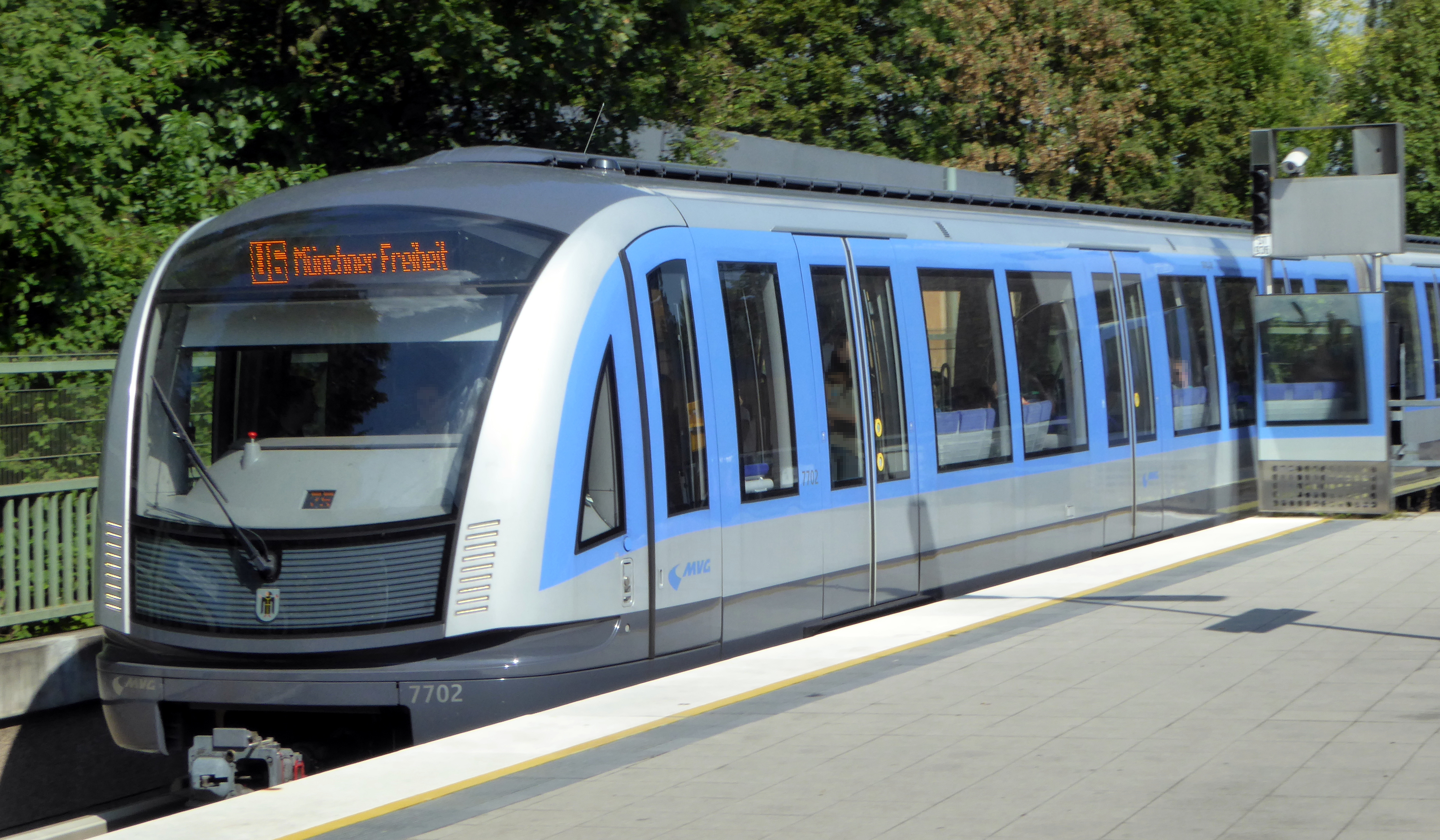
Class C2 train at Studentenstadt

=== Operation ===
MVG has increased service frequencies in recent years:

- Busy lines (U1/U2/U7/U8 and U3/U6): every 5 minutes
- Less busy lines (U4/U5): every 10 minutes

Train formations:

- Langzug (long train): three Class A/B units or one Class C1/C2 set
- Kurzzug (short train): one or two Class A/B units, used on less busy lines or during off-peak hours

During the COVID-19 pandemic in 2020, Kurzzug services were temporarily suspended.

The U3/U6 corridor is particularly prone to service interruptions due to high passenger volumes, technical issues, and frequent maintenance. This congestion was a key factor in planning the future U9 line.

Since 2025, night services operate on Fridays, Saturdays, and nights before public holidays. All six main lines run at 30-minute intervals.

== History ==
Already in 1905 there were plans to build an underground metro in and about the route of today's trunk line of the S-Bahn between the main and Ostbahnhof and a ring road that surrounds the old town. Since these plans for the then traffic were clearly oversized, they came back into oblivion. The tram network was able to cover the traffic flows in the former half-million city. From 1910, the only 450 m long, automated Munich subway metro connected the main station with the post office on Hopfenstraße. It served only for the transport of letter post. In 1928 there were again plans to replace the trams in Munich by a subway network, but any such plans for this were thwarted the global economic crisis. A network of five subway routes, which had some similarities with today's route distribution, was to be realized.

At the time of Nazi Germany, from 1936, a network of electric subterranean railways was planned for the "capital of the movement" and construction was begun, but the Second World War put an end to this. The tunnel of today's U6 between Sendlinger Tor and Goetheplatz – including the station there – were already completed in the shell, but still as part of a rapid-transit railway route. This also explains the relative generosity of Goetheplatz (especially in the blockade entrance Goetheplatz does not fit the architecture today) and the narrowness of the present interchange station Sendlinger Tor on the platform U3 / U6. In the Lindwurmstraße took place on 22 May 1938, the groundbreaking ceremony for this tunnel, which should herald the beginning of the end of the tram. By 1941, the shell was completed, first railcars were to be delivered in the same year. The war-related scarcity of resources led to the cessation of this work. The shell was used during the war as an air-raid shelter, of which today still bears inscriptions on the tunnel walls.

Parts of the tunnel were filled with debris after the war, others served for a while as a breeding ground for mushrooms, before penetrating groundwater made the short piece of early metro history unusable. The Nazis forbade the acquisition of new rolling stock for the Munich tramways in order to show how "insufficient" the tram system was. At that time, trams were the primary means of public transportation in Munich. The Nazis made ambitious plans to change Munich into their "Reichshauptstadt der Bewegung" (Capital of the movement; the Nazi party had come to existence in Munich). This included the construction of an underground system. In the late 1930s, construction started in Lindwurmstraße and Sonnenstraße, where Munich's main Lutheran-Protestant church, Matthäuskirche, was torn down because it was supposedly a "traffic obstacle" (so was the Munich's main synagogue not far away as well as the tower of the Old Town Hall). Construction was abandoned in 1941 as World War II intensified. After the war, the priority was to reconstruct the badly damaged tram system.

However, even during the 1950s the Munich City Council discussed plans to run a few of the tram lines underground because the capacity for surface traffic was overstretched. It planned four diameter lines (designation A, B, C, D), which divided the city into eight sectors and contained essential elements of today's network of lines. An east–west line "A": Pasing – Laim – Westend – Stachus (change in line "B") – Marienplatz (change in line "C") – Ostbahnhof – Berg-am-Laim. Another line "B": Moosach – Gern – Rotkreuzplatz – Stiglmaierplatz – Stachus (change in line "A") – Odeonsplatz – Max Weber Square – Bogenhausen – Zamdorf – Riem. A north–south line "C" was along Freimann – Münchner-Freiheit – Marienplatz (change in line "A") – Goetheplatz (already built 1938–1941 interchange station to the line "D") – Harras – Waldfriedhof planned. A north–south line "D" with the lines: Settlement am Hart – Scheidplatz – Elisabethplatz – Central Station – Goetheplatz (change to line "C") – Giesing.

In 1964 plans were, however, changed and it was decided to build a "real" underground network as follows:

- U1: Moosach Bf – (Dachauer Str.) – Hbf – Goetheplatz – Kolumbusplatz – Giesing Bf – Neuperlach Zentrum
- U2: Amalienburgstr. – Rotkreuzplatz – Hbf – Goetheplatz – Kolumbusplatz – KH Harlaching – Großhesseloher Brücke
- U3: Heidemannstr. – Scheidplatz – Münchener Freiheit – Marienplatz – Goetheplatz – Fürstenrieder Straße – Blumenau
- U4: Pasing – Laimer Pl. – Heimeranplatz – Hbf – Theatinerstr. (Marienplatz Nord) – Max-Weber-Pl. – Arabellapark – St. Emmeram
- U5: Pasing – like U4 – Max-Weber-Pl. – Leuchtenbergring – St.-Veit-Str. – Waldtrudering
- U6: Kieferngarten – Münchner Freiheit – Marienplatz – Goetheplatz – Harras – Waldfriedhof – Großhadern
- U8: Hasenbergl – Am Hart – Scheidplatz – Theresienstr. – Karlsplatz (Stachus) – Sendlinger Tor (4. Stammstrecke) – Kapuzinerstr. (Kreuzungsbf mit U1/2) – Thalkirchen – Aidenbachstr. – Fürstenried West

Calls for a ring line of the subway were soon rejected, as this was the tangential passenger volume was too low, but you took in the construction of the S-Bahn trunk line at Rosenheimer Platz station consideration that should not be built the possibility of a crossing station here. Today, the tram takes on the most tangential traffic flows, the concept of a ring metro has been adopted.

Work started on 1 February 1965 at Nordfriedhof (North Cemetery) in Ungererstraße (now known as Schenkendorfstraße). Today a steel girder at the first building site is a monument to Munich's first underground railway. When the 1972 Summer Olympics were awarded to Munich in 1966, construction had to be sped up to get the "Olympic" line finished on time. On 19 October 1971 the first line commenced operations between Kieferngarten and Goetheplatz with a total length of 12 kilometres (7.5 mi). On 8 May 1972 the line between Münchner Freiheit and Olympiazentrum ("Olympic line") to the venues of the Olympic Summer Games 1972 was opened, just 10 days after the Munich S-Bahn commenced operations. To satisfy demand during the Games, some DT1 trains were borrowed from Nuremberg. On 22 November 1975 the extension from Goetheplatz to Harras was opened. The network has been expanded continuously since 1980.

The activities of the U3 and U1 should be extended on a case-by-case. The beginning of the extension of U1, from Westfriedhof to Georg-Brauchle-Ring, opened on 18 October 2003, whereas another station, Olympia-Einkaufszentrum was later opened on 31 October 2004. Similarly, on 28 October 2007, the new era had resulted in U3, extending from Olympiazentrum, via Oberwiesenfield, to the Olympia-Einkaufszentrum, and later on it was extended to Moosach on 11 December 2010. This is a similar concept to the fictional U3 extension, which was achieved in 2007 and 2010 respectively.

The new Allianz Arena (football stadium) required a larger capacity of the nearby U-Bahn station at Fröttmaning. A new second platform was built and the whole station was moved north by roughly 100 metres (330 ft). For easy access to the platform, a second pedestrian bridge was built at the north end of the platforms. At the same year, U6 was extended on 14 October 2006 from Garching-Hochbrück to Garching-Forschungszentrum via Garching. This is a similar concept to the fictional U1 extension, where it had needed a new series of trains.

=== Timeline ===
Opened	Line	Section	Length	New stations
19 October 1971	U6	Kieferngarten–Goetheplatz	12 km (7.5 mi)	13
8 May 1972	U3	Münchner Freiheit–Olympiazentrum	4 km (2.5 mi)	4
22 November 1975	/	Goetheplatz–Harras	2.7 km (1.7 mi)	2
28 May 1978	/	Poccistraße infill station	––	1
18 October 1980	U2	Scheidplatz–Neuperlach Süd	16 km (9.9 mi)	18
16 April 1983	/	Harras–Holzapfelkreuth	2.7 km (1.7 mi)	3
28 May 1983	(West)	Central Station–Rotkreuzplatz	3.3 km (2.1 mi)	3
10 March 1984	/	Westendstraße–Karlsplatz (4.6 km (2.9 mi)) + connection tunnel to / (1.4 km (0.9 mi))	6 km (3.7 mi)	6
1 March 1986	/	Karlsplatz–Odeonsplatz	0.7 km (0.4 mi)	1
24 March 1988	/	Westendstraße–Laimer Platz	1.4 km (0.9 mi)	2
27 October 1988	U5	Odeonsplatz–Innsbrucker Ring	4.1 km (2.5 mi)	7
27 October 1988	U4	Max-Weber-Platz–Arabellapark	3.6 km (2.2 mi)	7
End of 1988	—N/a	Enlargement of Technical Base	0.3 km (0.2 mi)	0
28 October 1989	(South)	Implerstraße–Forstenrieder Allee	6.1 km (3.8 mi)	6
1 June 1991	(South)	Forstenrieder Allee–Fürstenried West	1.9 km (1.2 mi)	2
22 May 1993	(West)	Holzapfelkreuth–Klinikum Großhadern	2.9 km (1.8 mi)	3
20 November 1993	(North)	Scheidplatz–Dülferstraße	5 km (3.1 mi)	5
30 June 1994	(North)	Kieferngarten–Fröttmaning	1 km (0.6 mi)	1
28 October 1995	(North)	Fröttmaning–Garching-Hochbrück	3.8 km (2.4 mi)	1
26 October 1996	(North)	Dülferstraße–Feldmoching	1.9 km (1.2 mi)	2
8 November 1997	(South)	Kolumbusplatz–Mangfallplatz	3.6 km (2.2 mi)	4
23 May 1998	(West)	Rotkreuzplatz–Westfriedhof	2 km (1.2 mi)	2
29 May 1999	(East)	Innsbrucker Ring–Messestadt Ost	7.7 km (4.8 mi)	6
18 October 2003	(West)	Westfriedhof–Georg-Brauchle-Ring	0.7 km (0.4 mi)	1
31 October 2004	(West)	Georg-Brauchle-Ring–Olympia-Einkaufszentrum	0.5 km (0.3 mi)	1
14 October 2006	(North)	Garching-Hochbrück–Garching-Forschungszentrum	4.4 km (2.7 mi)	2
28 October 2007	(North)	Olympiazentrum–Olympia-Einkaufszentrum	2.2 km (1.4 mi)	2
11 December 2010	(North)	Olympia-Einkaufszentrum–Moosach	2 km (1.2 mi)	2

== Future expansions ==
=== Extensions under construction ===
==== U5 (west) – extension to Pasing Bahnhof ====
The Laimer Platz-Pasing extension has been approved on 14 July 2015 as to relieve the overburdened tram and bus routes serving the area between Laimer Platz and Pasing neighbourhoods. In case of S-Bahn disruption between Pasing Bahnhof and Ostbahnhof via Hauptbahnhof, the U5 can supplement the connection between both stations. Construction commenced in 2024 at cost of 1.3 billion euros and is planned to open in the early 2030s. Two new subway stations are to be constructed between Pasing and Laimer Platz, namely Baumschule Laim and Am Knie. When completed, U5 will be the only subway line in Munich to connect Hauptbahnhof with both west (Pasing) and east (Ostbahnhof) termini that provide regional and long-distance train services.

==== U5 (west) – new station in Freiham ====
The residents called for the further extension of U5 to Freiham from Pasing Bahnhof. MVG initially rejected the proposal due to higher cost and two S-Bahn lines already serving the northern and southern areas of Freiham. Extending the tram line from Pasing Bahnhof to Freiham was considered as a cheaper alternative. On 17 July 2015, the citizen initiative and petition drive took place, supported by Christian Social Union (CSU) and Social Democratic Party (SPD) to extend U5 line further to Freiham. In January 2019, the city council passed the resolution to proceed with the further extension of U5 to Freiham. Due to the anticipated population growth, the subway line is more preferable than tram line in keeping up with the increasing demand. Additionally, the western terminus is to be located in Freiham city centre, serving the suburban town better than two S-Bahn lines in north and south.

On 26 January 2020, the city council approved the plan to extend the U5 further to Freiham with the construction commencing at the same time as the construction of Pasing Bahnhof subway station in 2021. The 750 million euros Pasing Bahnhof-Freiham extension is 4.5 kilometres long and has four new stations: Westkreuz, Radolfzeller Straße, Riesenburgstraße, and Freiham Zentrum. The date of completion is anticipated to be in 2035–2040.

On 28 July 2020, the administrative district of Oberbayern has approved the route alignment and construction plan for the second segment between the future subway stations Willibaldstraße and Am Knie. The second segment is routed from Willibaldstraße U-Bahnhof between Landsberger Straße and Agnes-Bernauer-Straße toward the two popular swimming, recreational, and sport centres (Westbad Hallenbad and Eis- und Funsportzentrums West). Am Knie U-Bahnhof will be located very close to the centres for quick and easy access.

Groundbreaking ceremony for the retention structure of the Freiham Zentrum station took place on 28 May 2024. Due to the construction taking place in an empty field, it won't require intervention into existing infrastructure, which will save around 50 million euros in building cost. The retention structure is planned to be finished by 2027. The 4.7 km long connection to Pasing via three stations (Riesenburgstraße, Radolfzeller Straße and Westkreuz) is expected in the 2040s.

==== U6 (south) – extension to Martinsried ====
This 1,300-metre (4,270 ft) extension will serve a large biotech centre at Martinsried. The estimated cost in 2012 was €73.3 million: since the extension crosses the municipality boundary of Munich, the large percentage of funding (95%) comes from Free State of Bavaria while Planegg and Munich contributed smaller percentages. The planning was approved in 2013, and the anticipated completion date was 2014–2015. However, the extension must go through the contaminated area and former gravel pit later filled in, leading to the complications and delays in planning. The construction of the subway tunnel began in February 2023 with anticipated completion in 2027.

=== Planned extensions ===
==== U4 (east) – extension to Englschalking Bahnhof ====
This extension is considered in the third medium-term planning (Mittelfristprogramm) along with the plan of moving a portion of S8 line from surface to underground between Unterföhring and Leuchtenbergring stations. Whether the extension would be approved and when will it be built is not clear. The stations are Cosimapark, Fideliopark, and Englschalking, all of which are in Bogenhausen.

==== U3 (west) – extension to Untermenzing ====
This extension continues from the U3's extension to Moosach, and it will go via Waldhornstraße. Whether the extension would be approved and when will it be built is not clear.

==== U5 (south) – extension to Taufkirchen ====
After the success of citizen initiative to extend the U5 West to Pasing and then to Freiham, the state parliament is exploring the extension south of Neuperlach Süd station to Taufkirchen. The extension would serve several important large-scale industries (including Ludwig-Bölkow-Systemtechnik and Airbus Defence and Space), the University of the Bundeswehr Munich, the Technical University of Munich Department of Aerospace and Geodesy, and suburban towns (Neubiberg, Ottobrunn, and Taufkirchen).

The six-kilometre extension with four new stations is estimated to cost 300–400 million Euros, and the exact route hasn't been determined yet. Due to the cost factor, the extension would be built above ground since the tunnel costs approximately €80 million per kilometre. The Bavarian minister president, Markus Söder, is pushing for the large portion of federal funding, following the recent change in the outdated federal law, Gemeindeverkehrsfinanzierungsgesetz (Municipal Transportation Finances Act), to address the issues with cost factor analysis for the suburban regions and beyond.

No construction or completion date is given yet.

=== Abandoned extension plans ===
==== U1 (south) – extension to Harlaching Hospital via Laurinplatz ====
Although the plans for this extension were quite advanced, low passenger forecasts have led to its abandonment in favour of a tram or light rail from Schwanseestraße. But in 2015 and 2016, it was also announced that it will be extended to Solln.

==== U1 (north) – extension to Feldmoching ====
With this extension, the U1 line would terminate at S-Bahn and U2 subway stations in Feldmoching. The subway station, Olympia-Einkaufszentrum, would be renamed as the Northern Cross. The extension is to connect with U2 line at current Hasenbergl subway station then continue to their terminus in Feldmoching. This plan was abandoned.

==== U2 (north) – extension to Karlsfeld ====
The city council of Bündnis 90 / Die Grünen and the CSU faction in the town council of Karlsfeld proposed the above-ground extension of the U2 from Feldmoching to Karlsfeld as a measure to relieve the municipality of the heavy car traffic. Moreover, this should provide a greater incentive for the employees of the large companies MAN and MTU to use public transport for their work. After initial investigations had shown a low cost-benefit ratio for this route, it was not cost-effective and was abandoned.

==== U6 (north) – extension to Munich Airport ====
This would be the only U-Bahn line with direct access to the Munich Airport. At Hallbergmoos station, U6 would continue in parallel with the S8 line to the airport and stop at both terminals before travelling further to Eching and Neufahrn. However, the plan was abandoned.

=== U9 and U29 bypass lines ===
Possible route of the new U9 line as planned in 2018

On 11 February 2014, SWM/MVG announced a detailed report for the construction of a new 10.5 km bypass line, a sixth intracity underground line, to be called the U9. The new line will relieve the overburdened U1/U2/U7/U8 and U3/U6 lines, especially the transfer stations at Sendlinger Tor (U1/U2/U7/U8 and U3/U6), Hauptbahnhof (U1/U2/U7/U8, U4/U5, and S-Bahn), and Odeonsplatz (U3/U6 and U4/U5), and will shorten the travel time between the Hauptbahnhof and the Allianz Arena by removing the need to transfer at Marienplatz or Odeonsplatz. MVG is predicting tremendous growth of passenger traffic in the northern section of Munich in the next twenty years and wants to plan accordingly.

The proposal was revised and approved in January 2018 to integrate the three major construction projects at Hauptbahnhof: the second S-Bahn tunnel and station, a new dedicated U9 platform, and the reconstruction of Hauptbahnhof. On 2 July 2019, funding for the U9 construction was approved, with most of the €3.5 billion to be provided by the federal government. The confirmed completion date is 2038 at latest.

The revised plan eliminates U6 service between Implerstraße and Münchner Freiheit to relieve the overburdened U3 and reduce the heavy congestion at Sendlinger Tor and Odeonsplatz when transferring between lines during rush hour. The U9 takes over the current U6's southwestern (Klinikum Großhadern – Implerstraße) and northeastern (Münchner Freiheit – Garching-Forschungszentrum) extensions. The new stations would be Martinsried (a new extension west of Klinikum Großhadern), Esperantoplatz, Hauptbahnhof (dedicated platform), Pinakotheken, and Elisabethplatz. At Münchner Freiheit, the U9 is connected to the current U6 tracks to continue to its northeastern terminus at Garching-Forschungszentrum. A second spur to connect with the U2 line at Theresienstraße is planned. This second spur would be called U29: Klinikum-Großhadern – Hauptbahnhof – Theresienstraße – Harthof and would extend the current U6 southwestern terminus from Klinikum-Großhadern to Martinsried.

Theresienwiese park has currently one subway station on site in the north but is served by two additional subway stations a few blocks away (U3/U6 – Goetheplatz in the southeast and U4/U5 – Schwanthalerhöhe in the west). Adding a second onsite subway station in the southeastern area would reduce the heavy Oktoberfest crowd at Theresienwiese station, especially at closing time. Both stations would have direct connection to Hauptbahnhof without transferring. The name of the second onsite station has not yet been officially determined, but the working title at moment is 2. Wiesnbahnhof. Esperantoplatz and Bavaria (in reference to the Bavaria statue nearby) have been suggested.

The museum quarter, Pinakothekenviertel, has one station, U2 – Königsplatz, but it is inconveniently located in the southwestern quarter, requiring a long walk to several Pinakotheken museums. The new station, Pinakotheken, would be centrally located in the museum quarter and serve the museums and Technical University of Munich within a short walking distance. Pinakotheken would be served by tram lines, Tram 27 and 28, along with several local and crosstown bus lines. The plan will also facilitate the connection between Technical University of Munich and Campus Garching.

The plan called for the closure of the current Poccistraße and Implerstraße subway stations and construction of a new four-track station underneath the Südring, serving the U3, U9, and U29, and connecting to the new aboveground station serving regional trains and possibly the S-Bahn if the future S-Bahn-Ring is approved. The new U-Bahn station would be called Impler-/Poccistraße to differentiate it from the current U3/U6 – Implerstraße and Poccistraße stations. The current Poccistraße station has serious structural problems requiring expensive maintenance and extensive monitoring; it is cheaper to build a new station nearby than to continue using Poccistraße.

At Hauptbahnhof, the new dedicated U9 platform would be built underneath the current S-Bahn platform but above the U4/U5 platform. The platform would be located underneath the regional and long-distance train tracks between Holzkirchner Bahnhof (Holzkirchner wing station, serving southeastern Bavaria) and Starnberger Bahnhof (Starnberg wing station, serving southwestern Bavaria) with a new mezzanine level connecting the U9 platform with both wing stations and the rest of Hauptbahnhof. The advantage of locating the U9 platform in the western section of Hauptbahnhof is a quick transfer between platforms without a long, circuitous walk from one platform to other via the grand platform in the east.

On 3 July 2019, Deutsche Bahn announced the new "2. Stammstrecke — Die Optimierungen" (Second Trunk Line Optimisation). The State of Bavaria and the Munich city council want the first U9 station to be built at the Hauptbahnhof at the same time as the reconstruction of the Hauptbahnhof main building and the construction of the second S-Bahn trunk line. The design revision relocates the U9 platforms from the west end of the regional and long-distance platforms to the middle of the main Hauptbahnhof building below ground. The relocation places the U9 station directly above the second trunk line station in a cross arrangement. This improves the passenger flow between two current U-Bahn lines (U4/U5 and U1/U2/U7/U8), one current S-Bahn trunk line, and the above-ground level.

=== U26 tangent line ===
Proposed U26 Tangent Line

Another proposal for crosstown travel in the north between U2 – Am Hart and U6 (or U9 when opened) – Kieferngarten is under consideration. This U26 would serve the people who live in the north and don't need to travel south in order to travel between northwest and northeast regions. The high cost and fewer stops as compared to a tram line would make this proposal less feasible.

However, the new massive expansion plan for BMW's Forschungszentrum (Research Centre) to the north of BMW headquarter buildings and manufacturing plants would employ about 40,000 employees by 2050. The increased number of employees would lead to the vehicular traffic chaos and collapse unless the new S-Bahn North Ring and new U26 are built with stations at Forschungszentrum. The higher capacity of U26 and underground placement (without impacting the vehicular traffic) could make it more feasible and possible than a tram line.

=== More booster lines ===
Different booster lines have been discussed for years without any concrete plans.

U10
Harthof – Münchner Freiheit – Odeonsplatz – Sendlinger Tor – Harras
A third booster line, U10, would share U2 line between Harthof and Scheidplatz then switch to U3 line between Scheidplatz and Implerstraße before turning to U6 line at Harras. The northern and southern terminuses have not been determined yet.
U11
Olympia-Einkaufszentrum – Westfriedhof – Central Station – Sendlinger Tor – Innsbrucker Ring
A fourth booster line, U11, would share U1 from Olympia-Einkaufszentrum to Kolumbusplatz before switching to U2 line for the continued journey to Innsbrucker Ring station. Which terminus station, Messestadt Ost in the east or Neuperlach in the south, has not been determined.
U12
Harthof – Theresienstraße – Hauptbahnhof – Theresienwiese – Implerstraße – Harras
A fifth booster line, U12, would share with U2 between Harthof and Theresienstraße then switch to U9 south of Theresienstraße where it shares with U9 toward Harras.

== Renovations and upgrades of subway stations ==
Platform Screen Doors

Munich U-Bahn system is experiencing the increasingly frequency of passengers and objects falling from the platforms into the tracks lately, disrupting the service. The latest statistics showed for 2018 215 passengers falling in and being rescued, 22 seriously injured or dead, 115 objects, and 10 animals. MVG plans the pilot project at Olympiazentrum up to two years to test the feasibility and to resolve any issues before deploying system-wide technology. If these test at Olympiazentrum stations are successful, platform screen doors will be implemented in the high-frequency stations first then gradually and successively added to more stations when they are being renovated. The anticipated completion date of system-wide installation is 2028.

Fröttmaning station (U6, North) — Completed

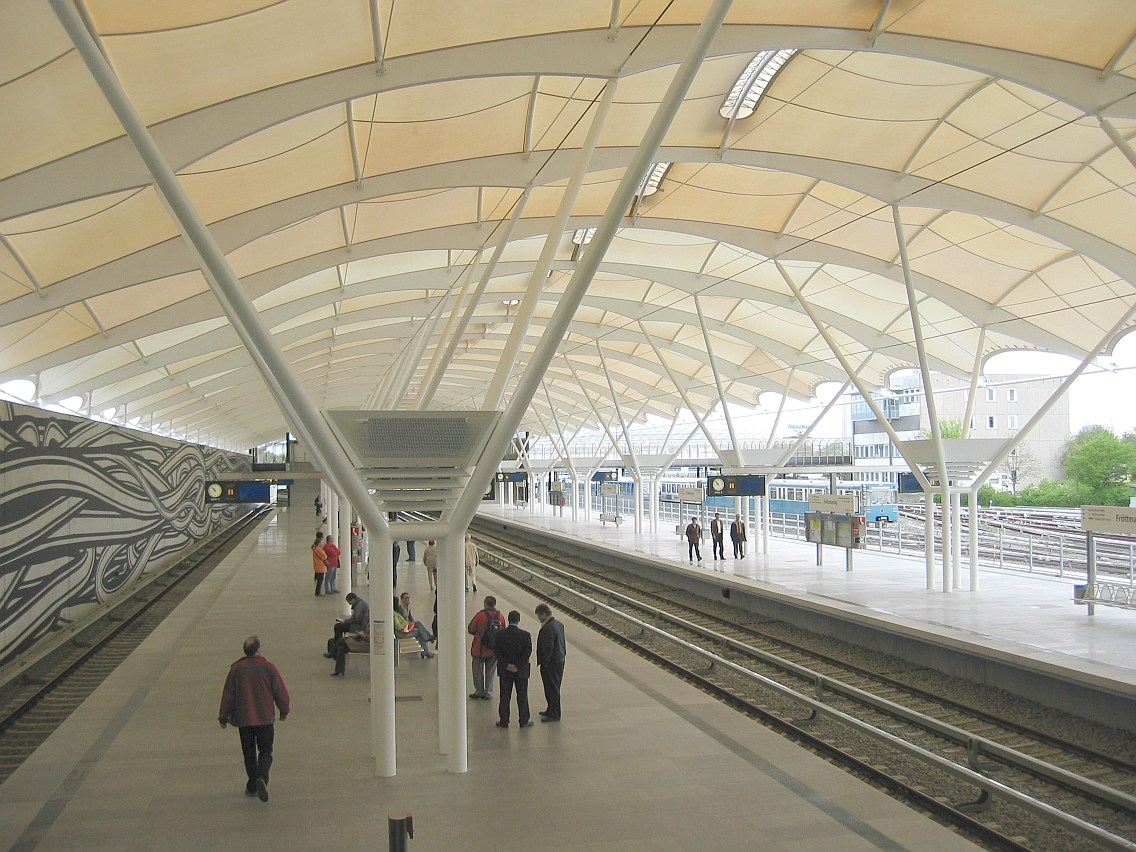
Fröttmaning

The new Allianz Arena (football stadium) required a larger capacity for the nearby U-Bahn station. A new second platform was built and the whole station was moved north by roughly 100 m (328 ft 1 in). For easy access to the platform, a second pedestrian bridge was built at the north end of the platforms.

Marienplatz station (U3/U6) — Completed

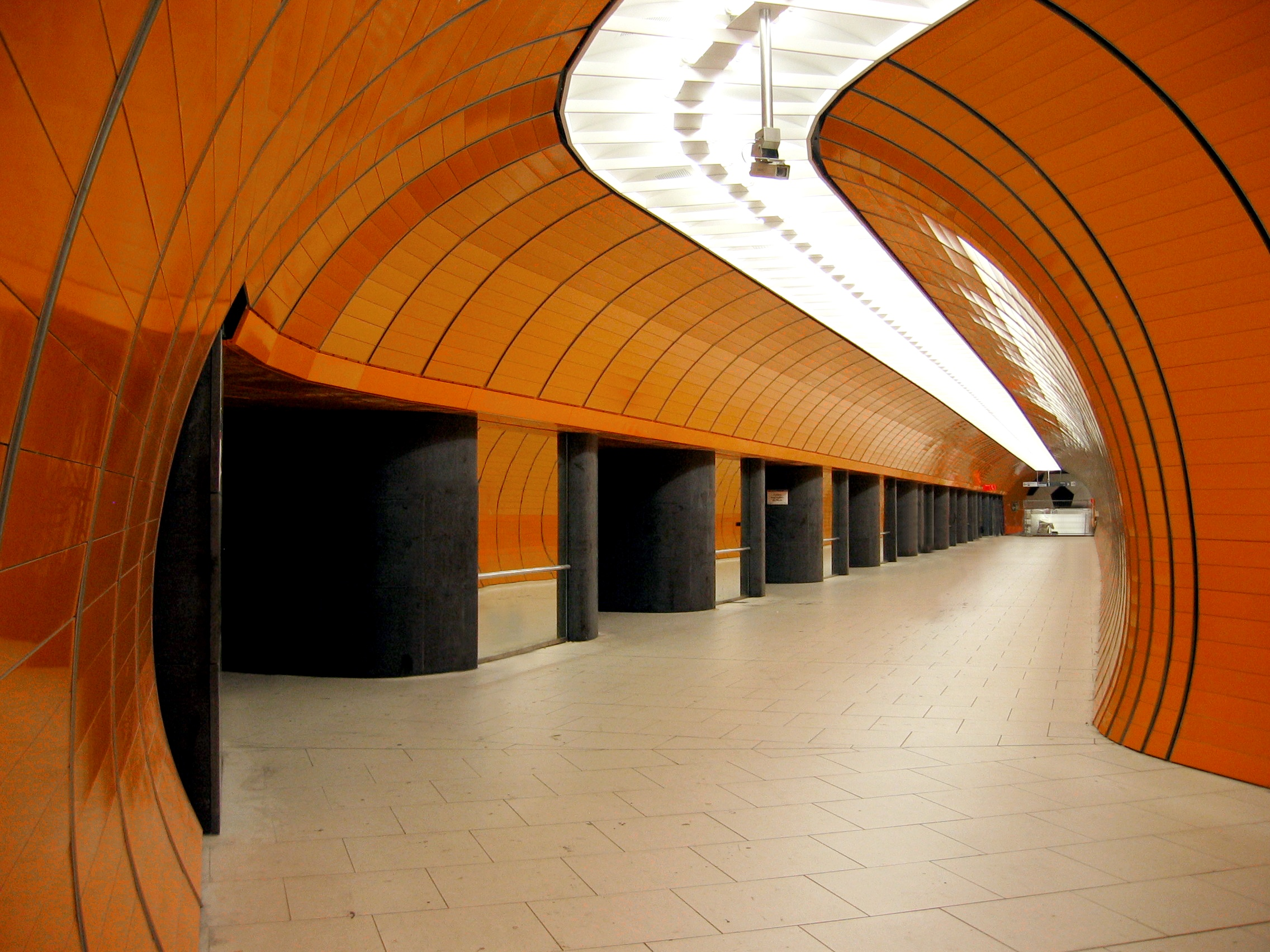
New pedestrian tunnel at Marienplatz station

The increase in traffic and the new Allianz Arena also required a larger capacity for this already overcrowded pivotal transfer station. New pedestrian tunnels were built, which provide more room for passengers transferring from and to the S-Bahn. They lie parallel to the existing platforms and are connected to them by 11 portals. At the south end, they meet the transverse tunnel, where the escalators to the S-Bahn platforms are located. To prevent Munich's historic town hall, located above the station and in between its two tunnels, from sinking in during the construction works, the ground surrounding the construction site had to be frozen over. The construction was completed in time for 2006 World Cup.

Karlsplatz (Stachus) (U4/U5) — Completed

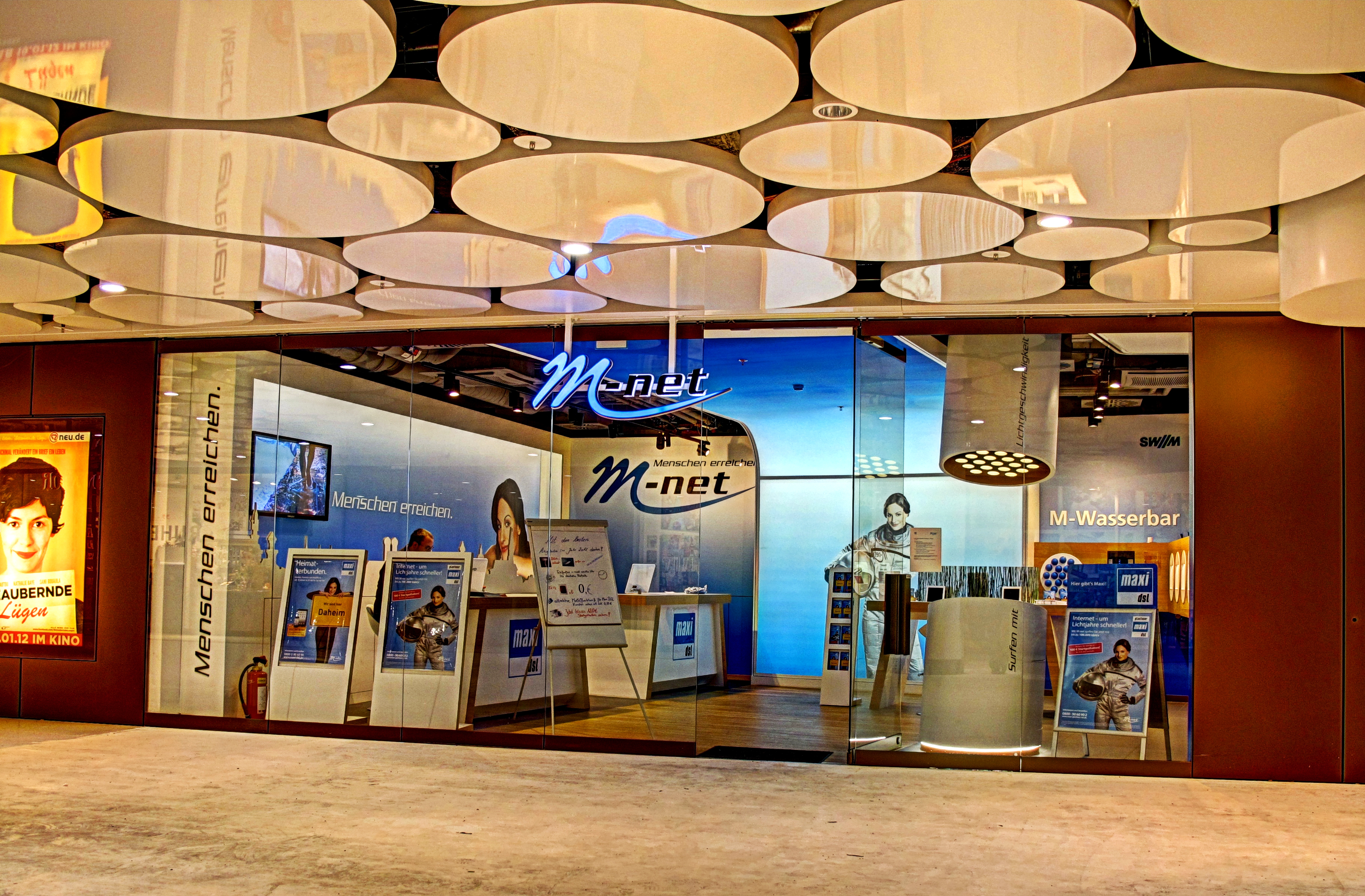
Renovated Karlsplatz (Stachus) mezzanine level

The two mezzanine levels and north entrance were renovated to include the enhanced fire protection and the updated interior. Due to the damage from humidity and water seepage, the structures of U4/U5 platforms were repaired and sealed up against further seepages.

Münchner Freiheit (U3/U6) — Completed

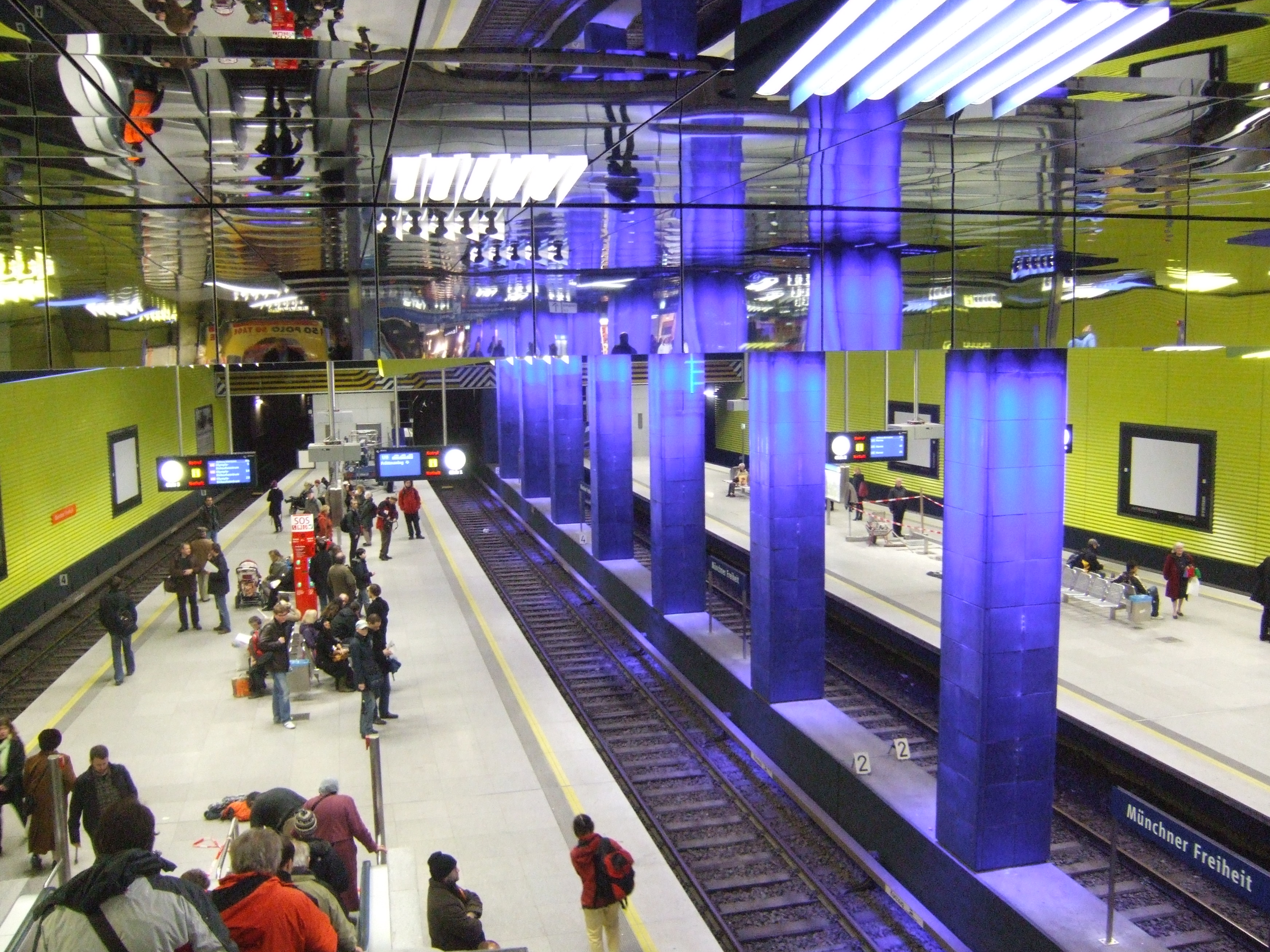
Renovated Münchner Freiheit station platforms

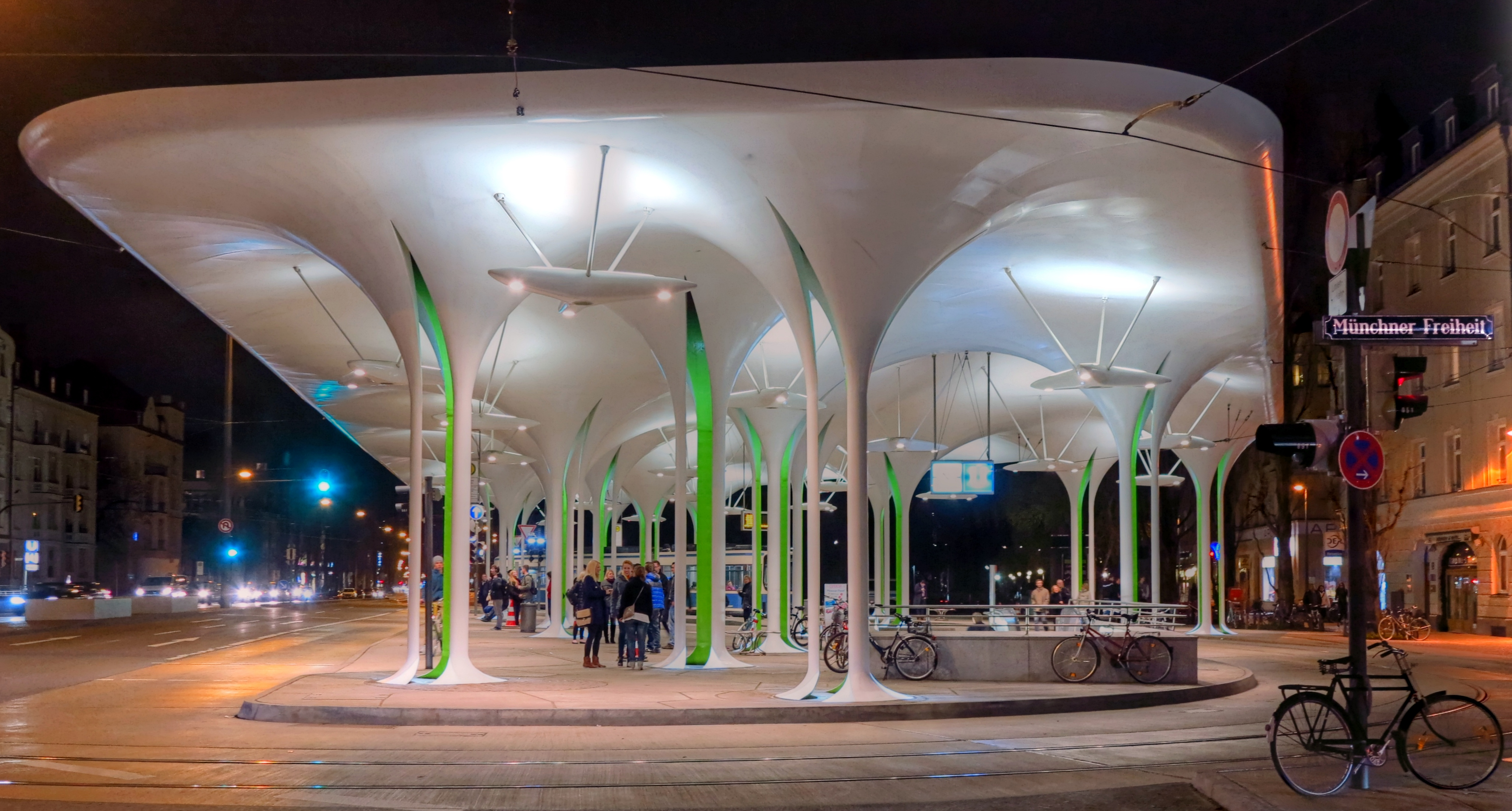
New covering roof at Münchner Freiheit

The interior has been updated with horizontally corrugated metal wall covering in fluorescent yellow. The square support columns are decked in deep blue tiles with blue lights casting down, giving them blue hue. The ceiling is covered with mirrors, giving the "infinite" height. The mezzanine level had been updated with new white floor. The aboveground tram and bus station received the new organic-shaped covering roof. An interesting fact: prior to renovation, the name was spelled with extra "e" in "Münchener". After the completion, the name is now "Münchner Freiheit" eliminating the extra "e", reflecting the current spelling trend, as well as a "return" towards more traditional Bavarian habits of spelling and pronunciation. Thus, it precisely mirrors the spelling on the street signs above.

Sendlinger Tor station (U1/U2/U7/U8 and U3/U6) — Completed

Due to poor design and unanticipated explosive growth of passenger traffic, Sendlinger Tor station had severe congestion and chokepoints for passengers moving between upper U3/U6 and lower U1/U2/U7/U8 platforms as well as upper levels (mezzanine and street). The €150 million renovation and upgrade of station was approved on 30 December 2015 by administrative district of Oberbayern. The project was scheduled to be completed in 2023 but delayed to 2024 due to the COVID-19 pandemic.

The U3/U6 platform had wide staircases and escalators connecting to the U1/U2/U7/U8 platforms below and mezzanine level above, and they created the narrow passageways on the platform. The narrow passageways lead to the dangerous chokepoints for passengers moving between the platforms or levels, especially during the rush hour. The U1/U2/U7/U8 platforms had only one corridor in the middle, connecting to the U3/U6 platform and upper levels. The combined landings of ascending and descending escalators and wide staircases from U3/U6 platform were placed too close to the U1/U2/U7/U8 platforms at either end of middle corridor. This causes the severe congestion during the rush hour when the passengers going downstairs must push through the passengers who are going upstairs.

The five lifts at the station did not connect directly to every level (two platform levels, mezzanine level, and street level). The two street level lifts were connected the mezzanine level only: they were located inconveniently further away from popular shopping street, Sendlinger Straße, requiring the passengers to cross the busy intersection to reach them. From the mezzanine level, the passengers either used two lifts to reach U1/U2/U7/U8 platforms or another lift to reach U3/U6 platform. If the passengers wish to transfer between upper and lower platforms via lifts, they must reach mezzanine level first and travel considerable distance to other lifts.

Additionally, the new EU safety directive 2016/798 requires additional fire protection in the subterranean train stations. Thus, installation of the partitions and doors that close automatically during the fire alarm at the landings of staircases and escalators.

The U1/U2/U7/U8 platforms have the new dedicated corridors built at north and south ends. The north corridor (Sonnenstraße-Verbindungstunnel) is connected to the mezzanine level: one set of escalators connecting to the mezzanine area and one staircase connecting to the lower landings of entrances A and B. The south corridor (Blumenstraße-Verbindungstunnel) is connected directly to the street level, bypassing U3/U6 platform or mezzanine level. Neither of them have the lifts. The north corridor has been opened to the public on 28 April 2020.

The middle corridor was widened by eliminating the mechanical and storage rooms on one side. This allows the higher and better flow of passengers on either side of escalators and staircases. The current lifts, staircases, and escalators between U1/U2/U7/U8 platforms and mezzanine remain unchanged.

The floors of both upper and lower platforms had been raised five centimetres to line up with the subway carriage's floor for barrier-free and stepless access with wheelchairs, prams, walkers, strollers, etc. The tactile tiles for the passengers with visual disabilities were installed for the first time at Sendlinger Tor station. Two lifts were reconstructed and expanded to the aboveground so they connect the mezzanine, two platforms, and ground level. This eliminated the need to transfer between the lifts in the mezzanine level when travelling between the aboveground and one of two platforms.

The escalators between U1/U2/U7/U8 and U3/U6 platforms were rearranged as to improve the flow while the wide staircases were eliminated.

The bilevel mezzanine area was renovated with one section rebuilt and levelled to eliminate the small stairs and narrow ramp, which interrupt the flow. The interior has blue and yellow colours, giving the station a bright and airy feel. The small shops, food vendors, and service centres were installed close to the completion.

On 20 September 2024, the seven-year reconstruction was completed to the great fanfare.

=== Plannings and in progress ===
The original planners in the 1960s and 1970s did not envision the massive growth of passengers, increased number of subway lines, and continued extensions of current subway lines in the forthcoming years. Thus, they did not design the subway stations accordingly as to make them "future proof". The intersecting subway lines cause the overcrowding and frustrating movements between two station platforms, especially at Hauptbahnhof (U1/U2/U7/U8, U4/U5, and future U9 as well as S-Bahn), Sendlinger Tor (U1/U2/U7/U8 and U3/U6), and Odeonsplatz (U3/U6 and U4/U5). The platform width and passage between stations and a fewer number of escalators were inadequate for larger number of people moving from one station to other as well as from aboveground to the underground during the rush hour.

Hauptbahnhof (U4/U5) — Planned

On 23 February 2020, MVG announced a new project to reconstruct U4/U5 platform at Hauptbahnhof for improved passenger movement between U1/U2/U7/U8 platforms below and mezzanine level above. One of the proposals called for installation of footbridge above U4/U5 platform that are connected at several points by unidirectional escalators and smaller lifts. No construction start date has been given. This coincides with megaproject of reconstructing Hauptbahnhof building and construction of new second S-Bahn trunk line and third U-Bahn line.

== See also ==
- List of Munich U-Bahn stations
- Munich S-Bahn
- Munich Tramway
- List of metro systems
- Rail transport in Germany
