= Haderner Stern station =

Station of the Munich U-Bahn

Haderner Stern
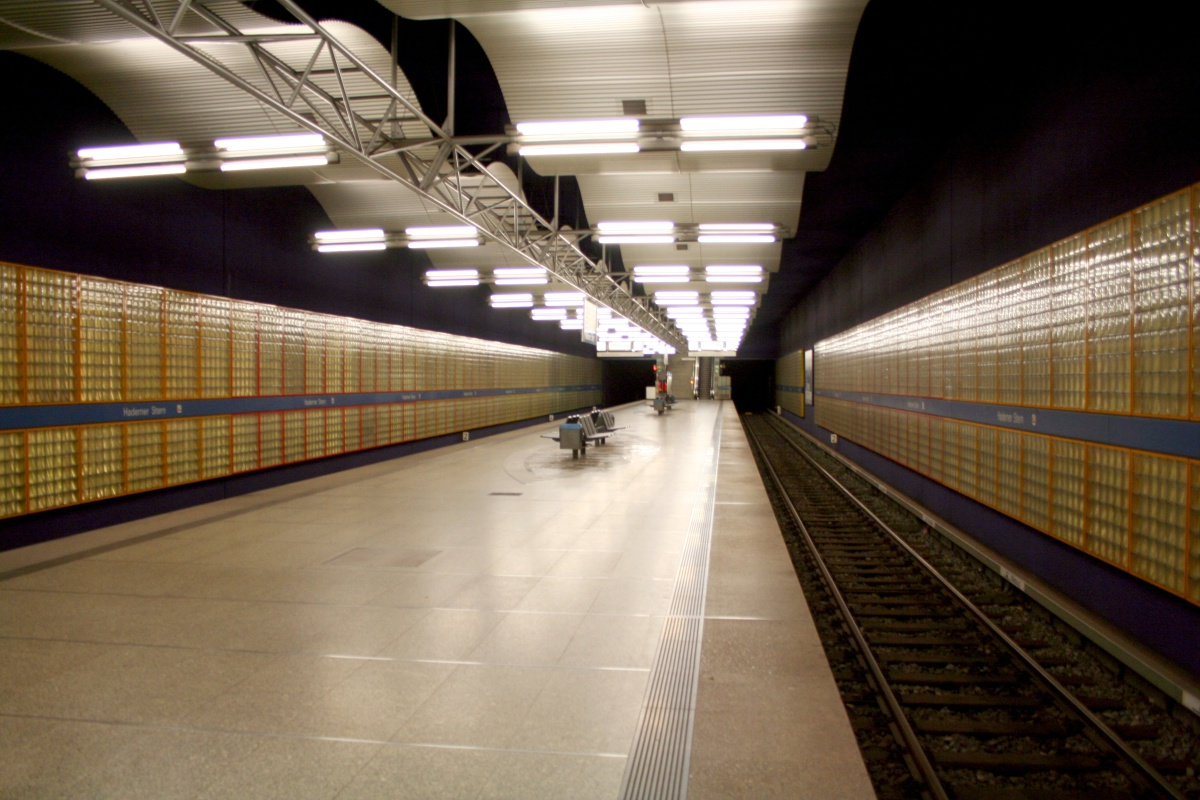

General information
- Location: Hadern; Munich, Germany
- Coordinates: 48°07′07″N 11°29′19″E
- Platforms: Island platform
- Tracks: 2

Construction
- Structure type: Underground
- Accessible: Yes

Other information
- Fare zone: : M

Services
Preceding station	Munich U-Bahn	Following station
Großhadern towards Klinikum Großhadern	U6	Holzapfelkreuth towards Garching-Forschungszentrum
Location

Haderner Stern is an U-Bahn station in Munich on the U6. It serves the nearby shopping centre and student accommodation.
