= Großhadern station =

Station of the Munich U-Bahn

Großhadern

General information
- Location: Hadern; Munich, Germany
- Coordinates: 48°06′54″N 11°28′38″E
- Connections: MVV buses

Construction
- Structure type: Underground
- Accessible: Yes

Other information
- Fare zone: : M and 1

Services
Preceding station	Munich U-Bahn	Following station
Klinikum Großhadern Terminus	U6	Haderner Stern towards Garching-Forschungszentrum
Location
- Location within Bavaria Location within Germany Location within Europe

Großhadern is an U-Bahn station in Munich on the U6.
