= Richard-Strauss-Straße station =

Station of the Munich U-Bahn

Richard-Strauss-Straße
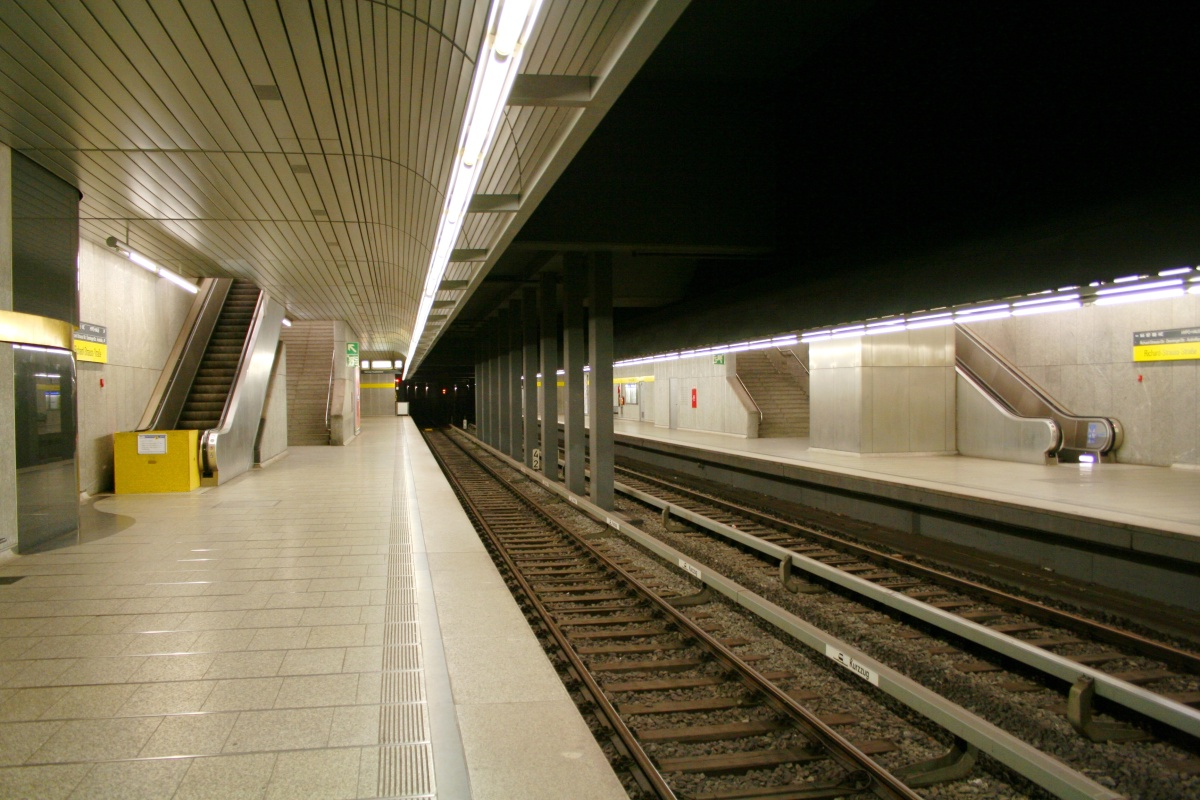

General information
- Location: Alt-Bogenhausen; Munich, Germany
- Coordinates: 48°08′56″N 11°36′59″E
- Platforms: 2 Side platforms
- Tracks: 2

Construction
- Structure type: Underground
- Accessible: Yes

Other information
- Fare zone: : M

History
- Opened: 27 October 1988

Services
Preceding station	Munich U-Bahn	Following station
Böhmerwaldplatz towards Westendstraße	U4	Arabellapark Terminus
Location

Richard-Strauss-Straße is a Munich U-Bahn station on the U4 line in the borough of Bogenhausen. It is located on the eastern fringe of Alt-Bogenhausen, the traditional core district. The station takes its name from Richard-Strauss-Straße, part of the Mittlerer Ring road system, that runs above the U-Bahn tracks, which was named for the famed German composer Richard Strauss. The station is serviced by the bus lines 59, 187, 188 and 189. Additionally, this subway station is one of three U-Bahn stations to have separate platforms at either side of the tracks rather than one in the middle serving both directions.

The station is located at the intersection of Denniger Straße and Richard-Strauss-Straße, near the headquarters of the Münchner Bank and the Arabella High-Rise Building.

== See also ==
- List of Munich U-Bahn stations
