= Garching station =

Station of the Munich U-Bahn

Garching

General information
- Location: Garching; Bavaria, Germany
- Coordinates: 48°14′57″N 11°39′09″E
- Platforms: 2 bore tunnels with a side platform
- Tracks: 2

Construction
- Structure type: Underground
- Accessible: Yes

Other information
- Fare zone: : 1 and 2

Services
Preceding station	Munich U-Bahn	Following station
Garching-Hochbrück towards Klinikum Großhadern	U6	Garching-Forschungszentrum Terminus
Location

Garching is an U-Bahn station in Garching on the U6.

== See also ==
- List of Munich U-Bahn stations
