= Therese-Giehse-Allee station =

Metro station in Munich, Germany

Coordinates: 48°05′41″N 11°38′34″E

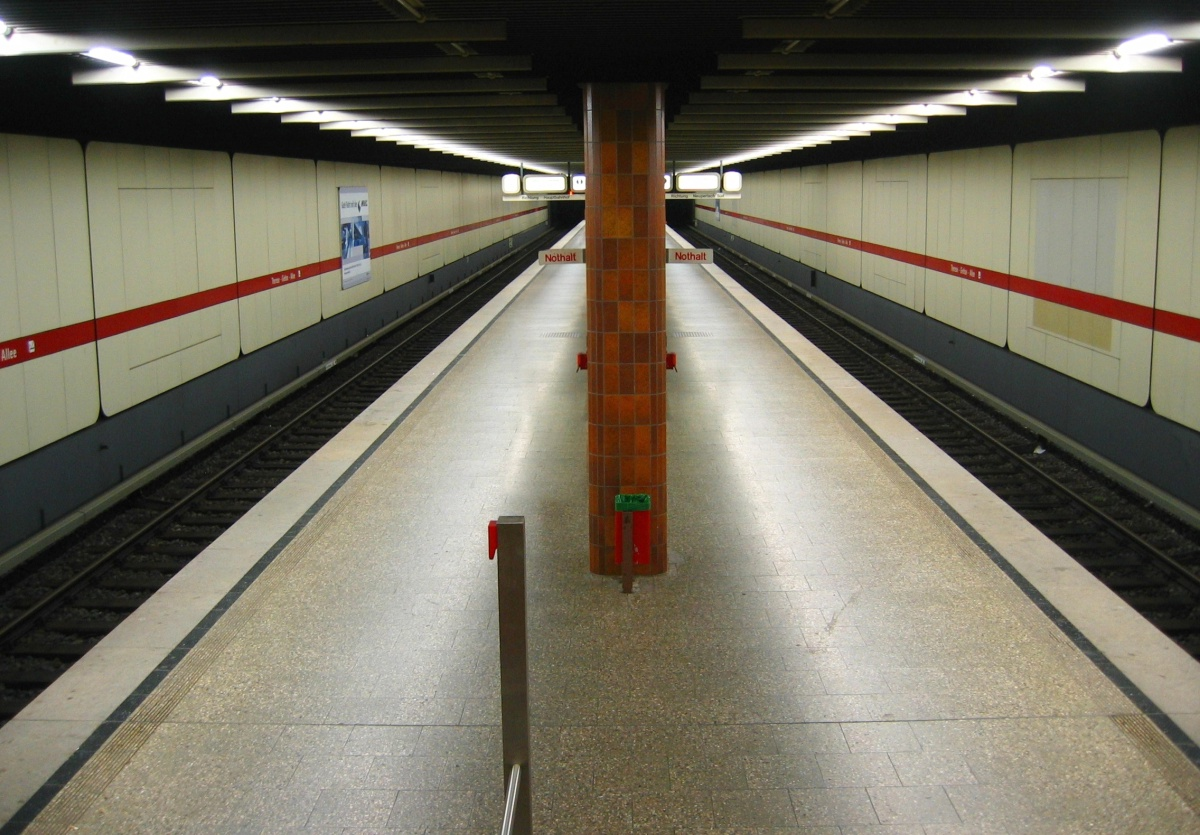
Therese-Giehse-Allee U-Bahn station

Therese-Giehse-Allee is a station on the U5 line of the Munich U-Bahn, named after the German actress Therese Giehse. The station serves a residential area and lies at the center of Neuperlach Zentrum and Neuperlach Süd stations, the final stop of the U5. It is integrated with the MVV (Munich Transport and Tariff Association).

Preceding station	Munich U-Bahn	Following station
Neuperlach Zentrum towards Laimer Platz	U5	Munich-Neuperlach Süd towards Neuperlach Süd
