= Holzapfelkreuth station =

Station of the Munich U-Bahn

Coordinates: 48°06′59″N 11°30′08″E

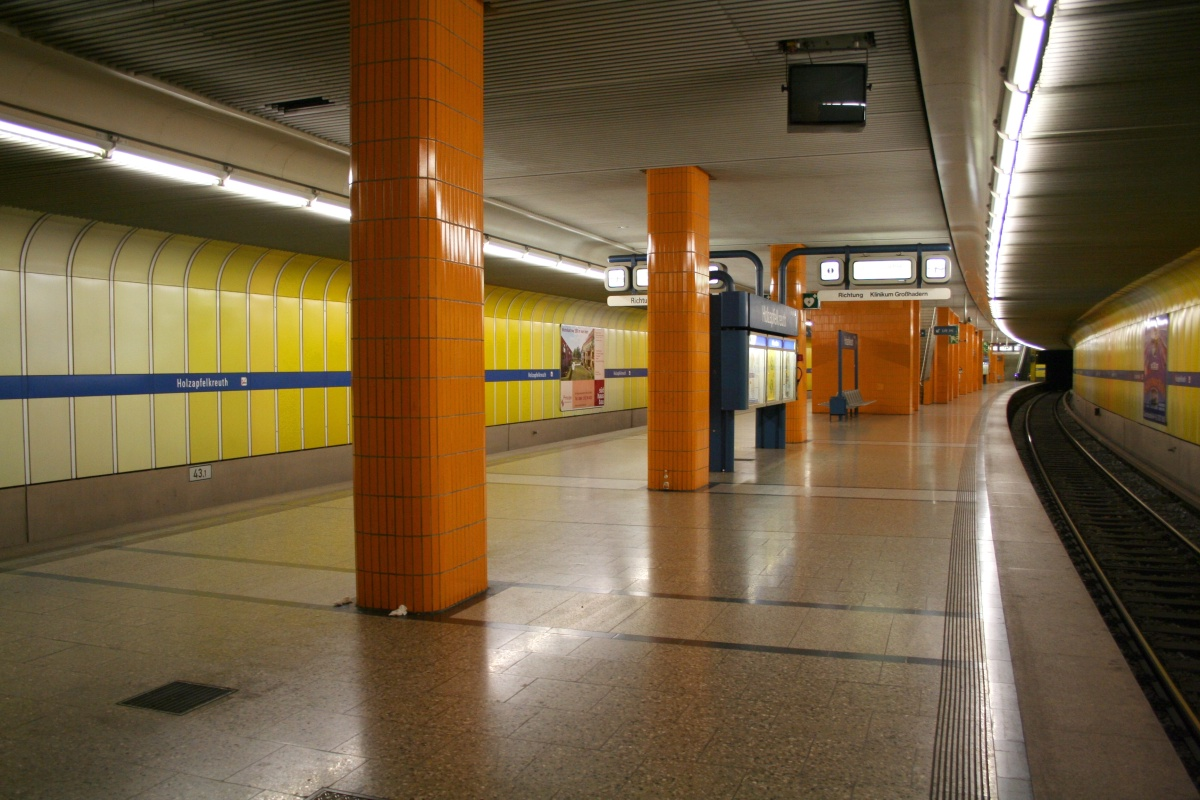
Holzapfelkreuth U-Bahn station

Holzapfelkreuth is an U-Bahn station in Munich on the U6.

The Munich metro station Holzapfelkreuth was opened on 15 April 1983 and was until 1989 the endpoint of the U3 and until 1993 the endpoint of the U6. It is named after the hunter family Holzapfel. Accordingly, in the 19th century Josef Holzapfel, the son of a former forester, lived there on his estate in the middle of the forest, in 1859 he acquired the estate built in 1844. Until then, the field was named Kreuth (= Reuten, the old German word for clearing - that is, originally it was only a forest clearing in the middle of the forest). Since then it has been called Holzapfelkreuth. Although Holzapfelkreuth was not yet in the city limits of Munich in 1889, it was a forestry economy. Holzapfelkreuther Strasse is still reminiscent of this economy today.

== See also ==
- List of Munich U-Bahn stations
- Local area and information on the station

| Preceding station | Munich U-Bahn | Following station |
|---|---|---|
| Haderner Stern towards Klinikum Großhadern | U6 | Westpark towards Garching-Forschungszentrum |
