= Basler Straße station =

Station of the Munich U-Bahn

Coordinates: 48°05′28″N 11°29′28″E

Basler Straße is an U-Bahn station in Munich on the U3. It was opened on 1 June 1991. The station is located in the Fürstenried Ost settlement under Züricher Straße at the junction of Berner Straße, after which the Swiss city of Basel is named.

== Architecture ==
The rear track walls consist of bored piles that have been left rough and grey. In addition, a devil peeks out of the wall, through which the architect and caricaturist Ernst Hürlimann alludes to the figures of the Basel carnival. The ceiling is made of sheet metal panels shaped into a square canopy. The platform, which is designed with an Isar pebble motif, is illuminated by two light strips. Furthermore, a lot of daylight penetrates into the station through the mirrored elevator shaft. Due to a lack of space, the drive for the elevator was housed in an oval advertising column on the platform. Basler Straße can be reached via the lift. At the western end, you can reach the surface by stairs via a small barrier level and at the east end directly by escalator.

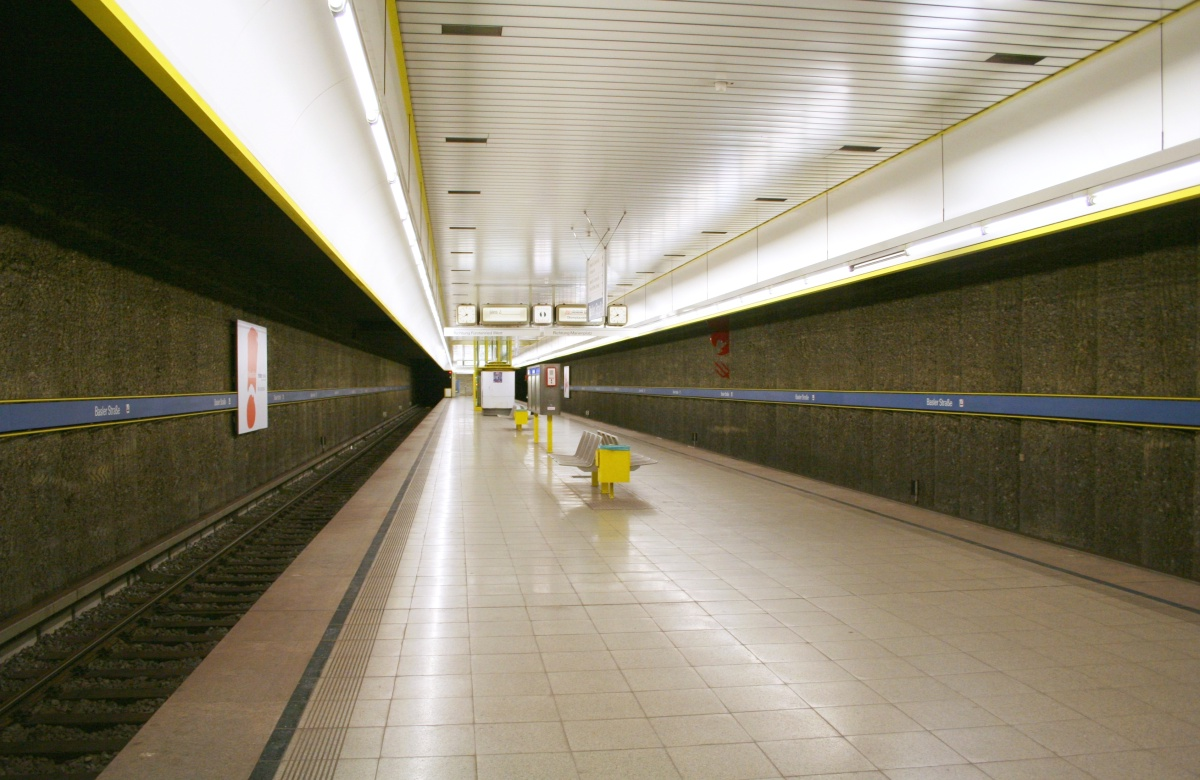
Basler Straße U-Bahn station

Preceding station	Munich U-Bahn	Following station
Fürstenried West Terminus	U3	Forstenrieder Allee towards Moosach
