= Böhmerwaldplatz station =

Station of the Munich U-Bahn

Böhmerwaldplatz
- Böhmerwaldplatz station platforms

General information
- Location: Parkstadt Bogenhausen; Munich, Germany
- Coordinates: 48°08′37″N 11°36′55″E
- Platforms: Island platform
- Tracks: 2

Construction
- Structure type: Underground
- Accessible: Yes

Other information
- Fare zone: : M

History
- Opened: 27 October 1988

Services
Preceding station	Munich U-Bahn	Following station
Prinzregentenplatz towards Westendstraße	U4	Richard-Strauss-Straße towards Arabellapark
Location

Böhmerwaldplatz is a Munich U-Bahn station on the U4 line, near Böhmerwaldplatz, in the borough of Bogenhausen.

== See also ==
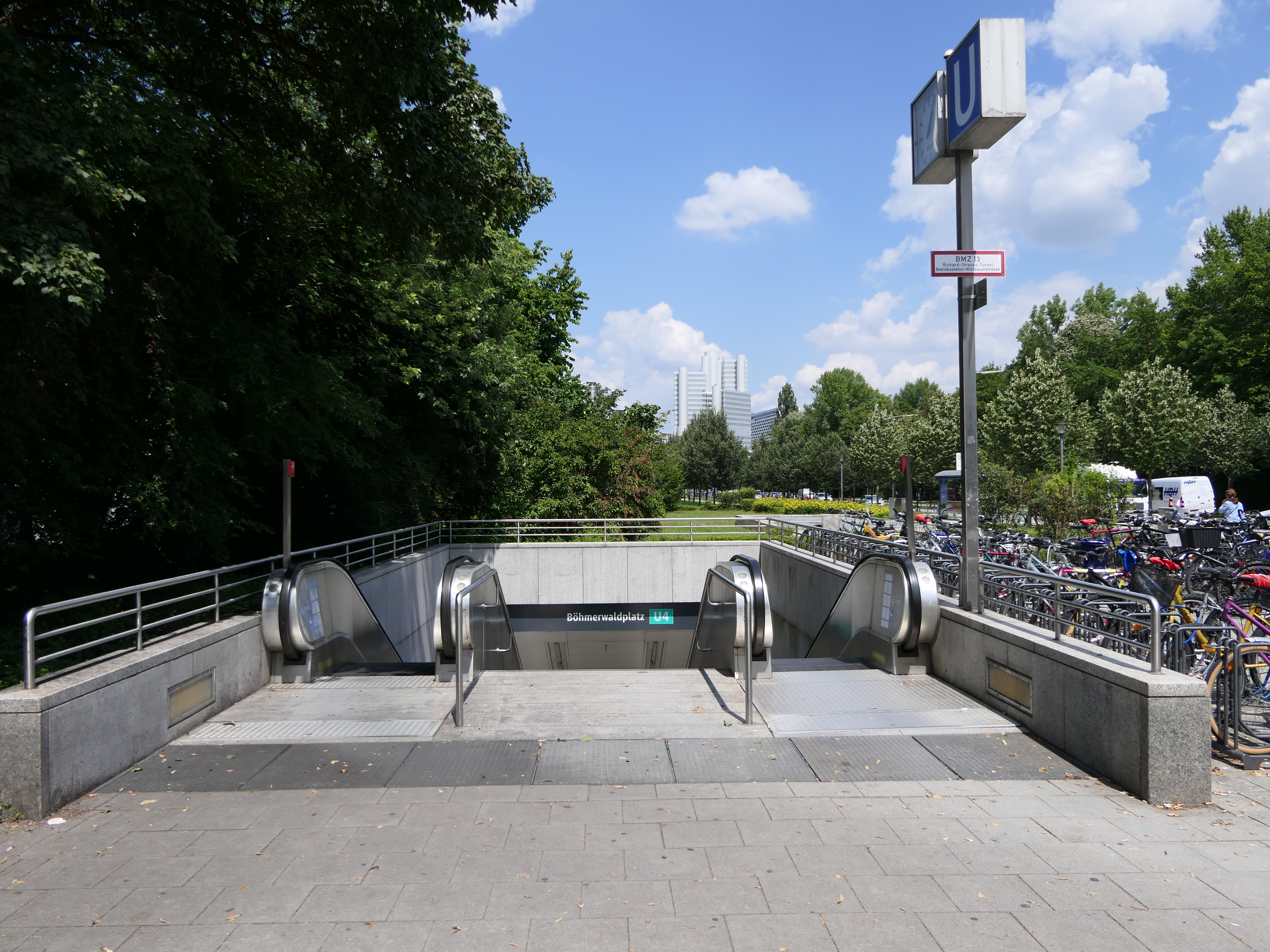
Entrance to Böhmerwaldplatz station

- List of Munich U-Bahn stations
