= Fürstenried West station =

Station of the Munich U-Bahn

Coordinates: 48°05′18″N 11°28′51″E

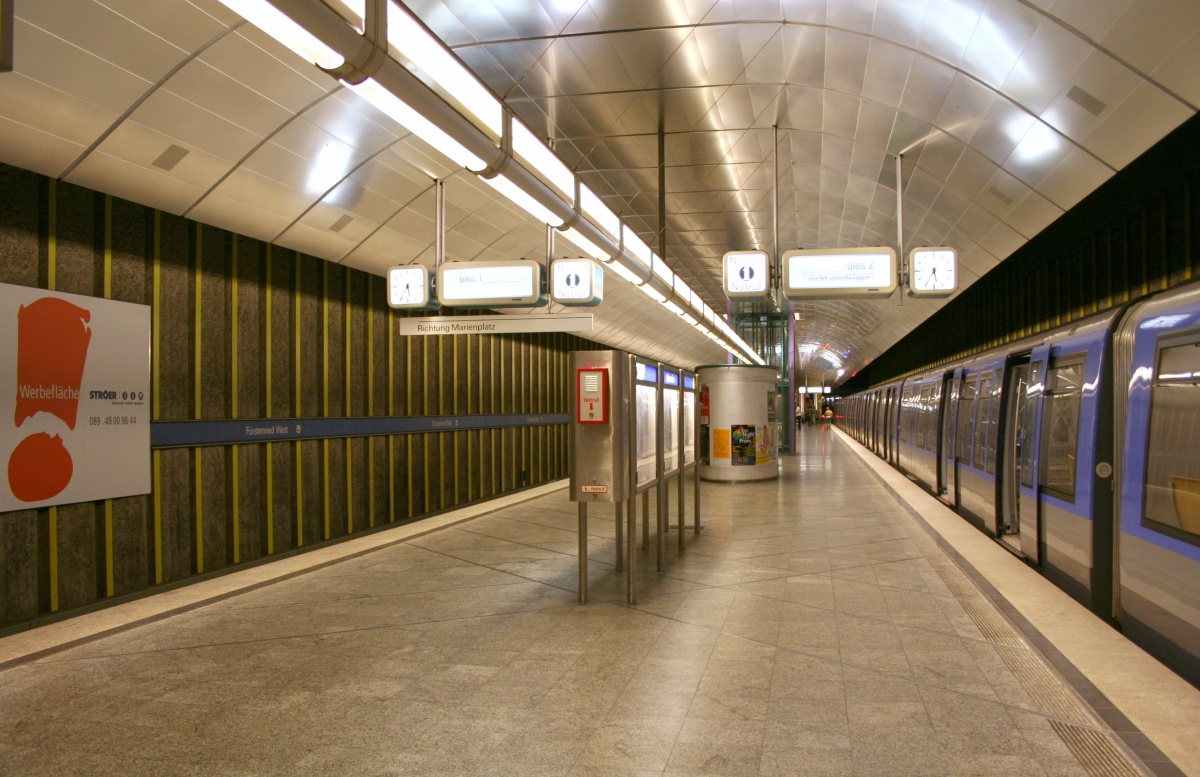
Fürstenried West U-Bahn station

Fürstenried West is an U-Bahn station in Munich on the U3.

The station opened 1 June 1991.

Preceding station	Munich U-Bahn	Following station
Terminus	U3	Basler Straße towards Moosach
