= Stammstrecke 2 (Munich U-Bahn) =

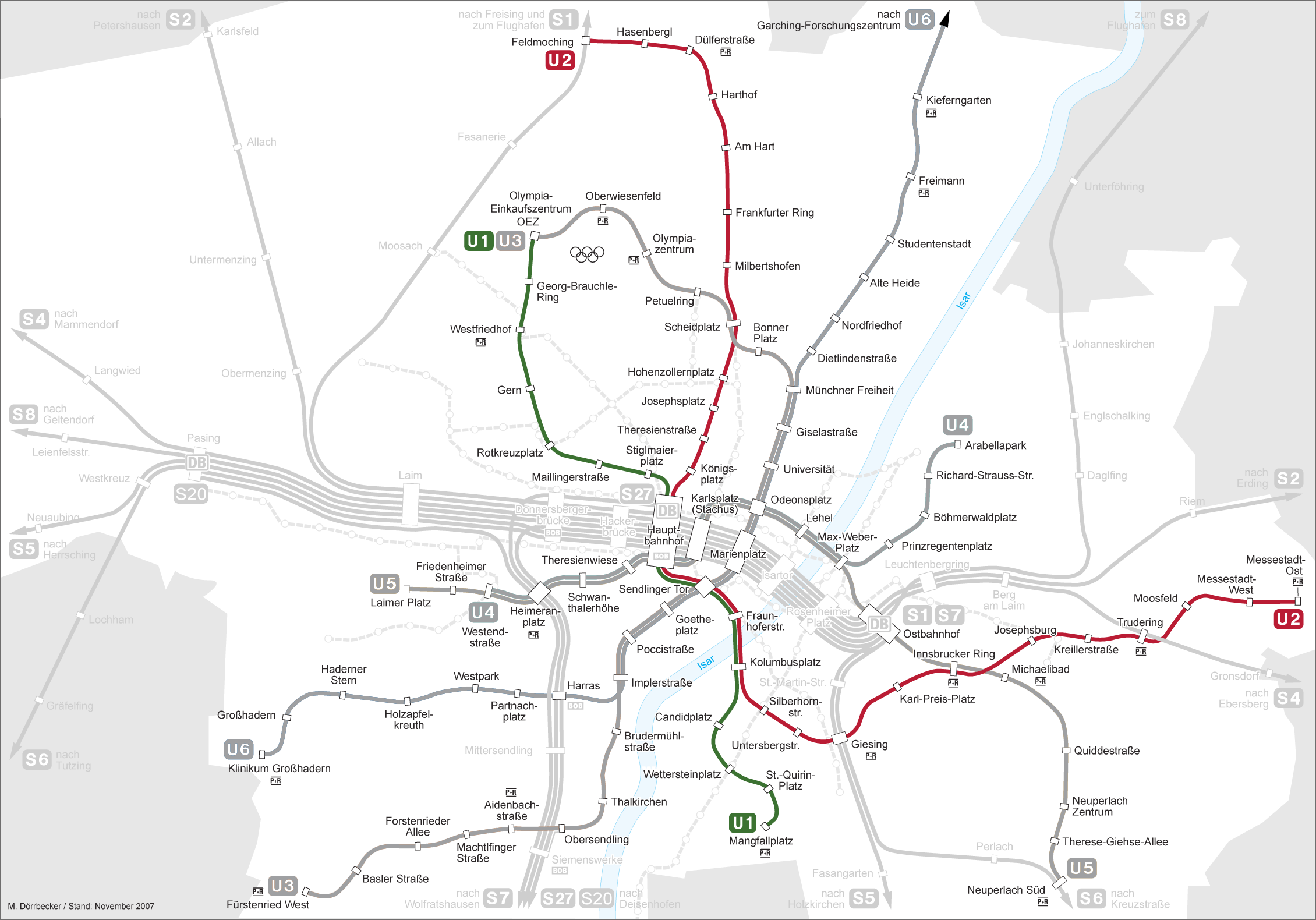
Course of the Stammstrecke 2

The Stammstrecke 2 of the Munich U-Bahn is one of three main routes in the subway network of the Bavarian capital Munich. It runs from north to south, as well as east, and is currently operated by the underground U1 and U2 lines. Since 12 December 2011, the U7 line runs during high traffic times and since 15 December 2013 the U8 line assists on Saturdays. The U1 and U2 lines only run together on one route, in the central inner city area, before and after that, they are branched away from each other. The main line 2 has a total length of 33.8 kilometers and 38 underground stations. It runs exclusively in the city of Munich and completely in the tunnel.

The construction of the Stammstrecke 2 began in 1971. In October 1980 the first section was opened between Scheidplatz and Innsbrucker Ring. In the following years, eight route extensions were carried out. The current expansion state was achieved in 2004. Further construction is possible, but not planned at the moment.

== History ==
The U1 was opened on 18 October 1980 and served as a reinforcement line for the U2. At that time, it operated between the main station and Innsbrucker Ring. On 8 May 1983, the line was extended to the Rotkreuzplatz. Until 1988, every second train traveled, in the high traffic times, to Neuperlach South. On 9 November 1997, the branch to Mangfallplatz was opened, which consists of four new stations and connects to the Untergiesing district. A year later a new section with two stations was opened at the Westfriedhof. In 2003, the U1 was extended again by a station to the Georg-Brauchle-Ring and a year later the today's most northern stop, the Olympic shopping center, was completed. Between 1999 and 2006 the U7 served as a reinforcement line to the Rotkreuzplatz. In addition, it was planned in 1980 to extend the U1 south to the Großhesseloher bridge and connect it to the tramway there.

Dülferstrasse (Munich U-Bahn)

The U2 became the line with the most frequently changing line end stop. It also changed its name, since it was initially called U8. It is the only line (taking into account the history of the U2 and U8 lines together) that runs on all three line families (U1/2, U3/6, U4/5).

Until the opening of the route to Dülferstraße in 1993, the U2, like the U3, traveled from Scheidplatz to the Olympiazentrum. On 26 October 1996, the route was finally extended via Hasenbergl to the present stop in Feldmoching.

Directly above the platform Königsplatz, an art museum (Kunstbau) was created in 1994, in a previously unused cavity, which can be reached from the barrier floor of the station. The exhibition area is located very close to the Lenbachhaus and is used for large temporary exhibitions of mostly modern or new art.

Until the opening of the route from the Innsbrucker Ring through the Trudering to the Messestadt in 1999, the U2 from the Innsbrucker Ring as well as the U5 to Neuperlach South, where the connection to the S-Bahn was. During the construction work on the track, an accident occurred at the Trudering station in 1994, when the ceiling of the newly opened tunnel collapsed due to penetrating water, and a bus fell into the formed crater. Two passengers of the bus as well as a construction worker died. This accident delayed the completion of this route, which was supposed to be opened at the opening of the new exhibition. The time until the subway opening had to be compensated by massive bus shuttle traffic from the S-Bahn stations Riem and Trudering. A memorial stone at the Trudering bus station recalls the disaster (see Trudering Bus Accident).

== Course ==
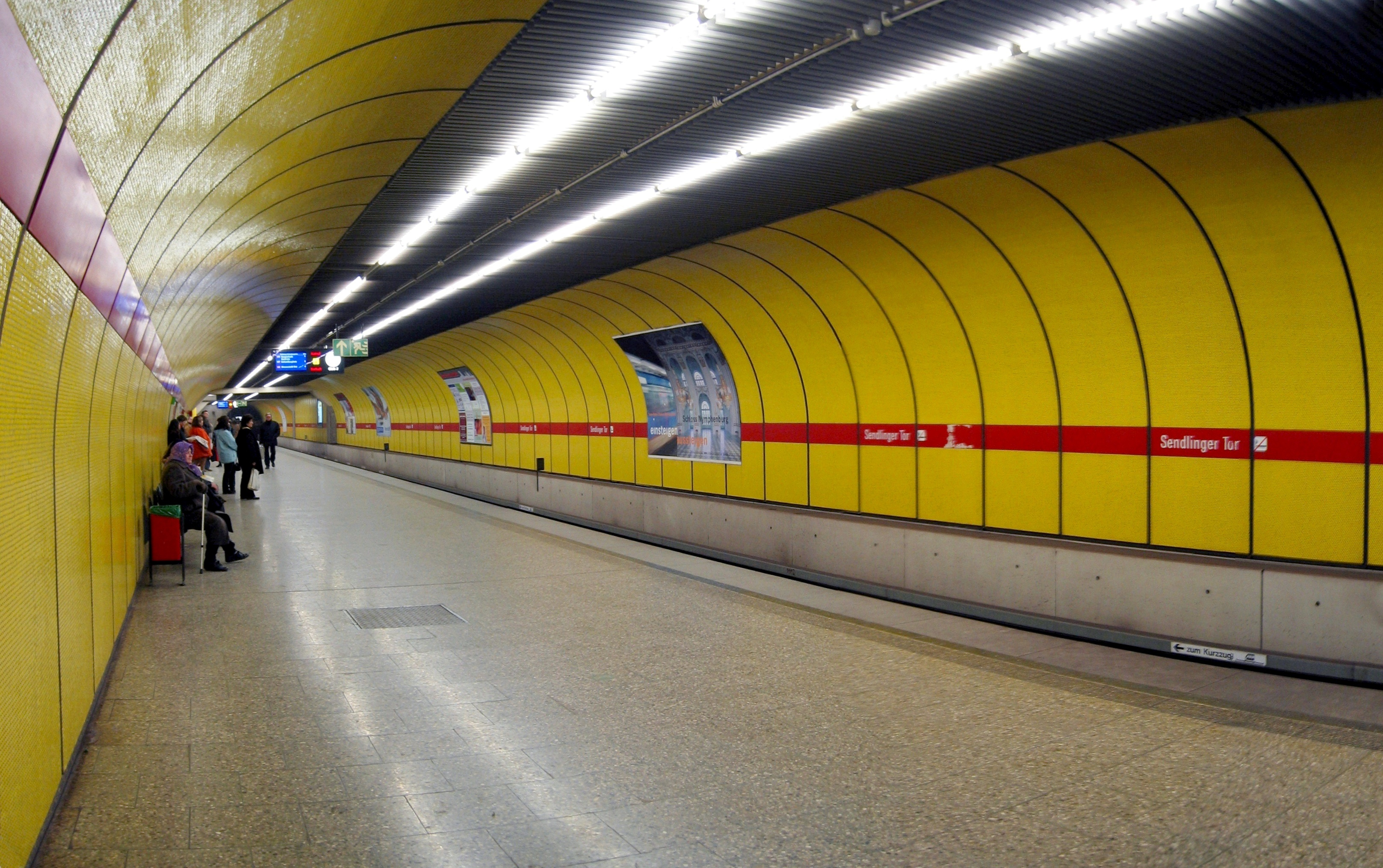
Sendlinger Gate

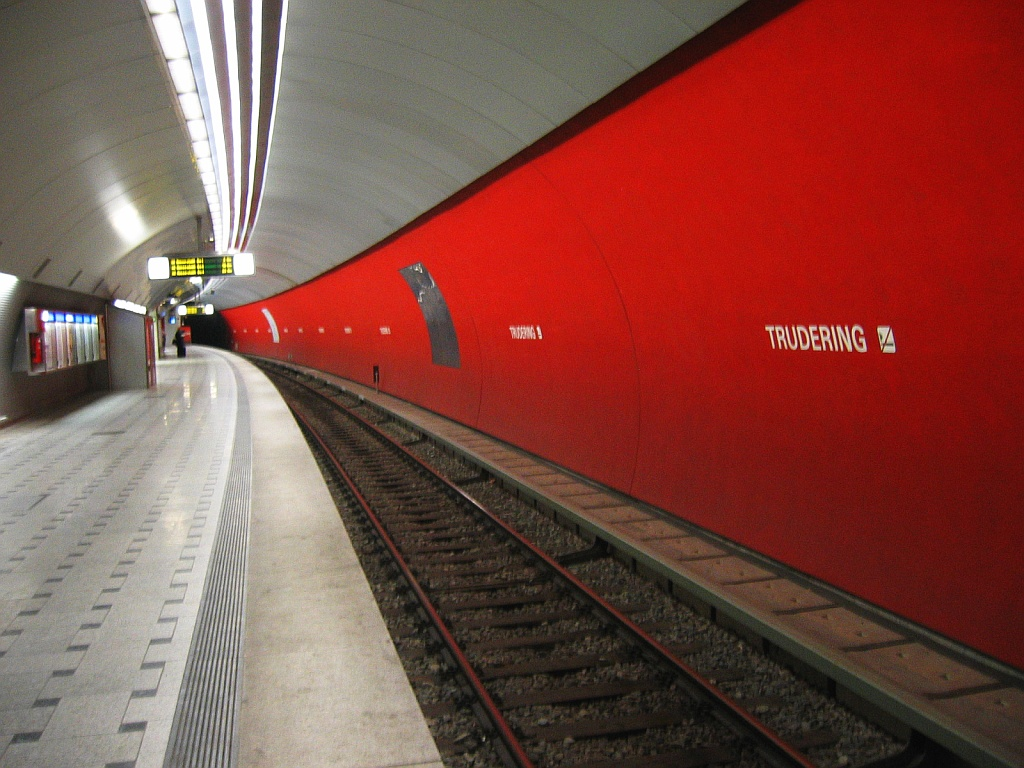
Trudering

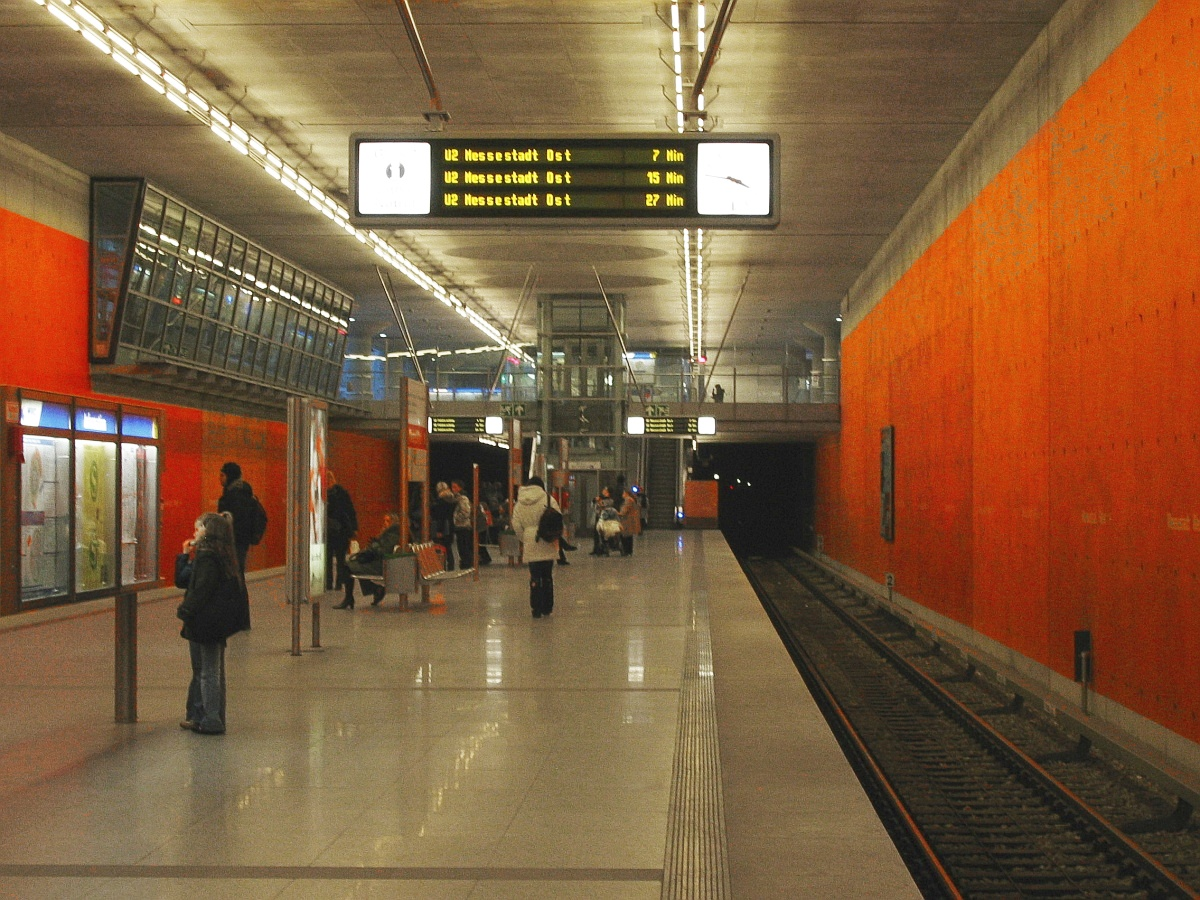
Exhibition Town West

=== North (U2) ===
Today the U2 starts in the north under the railway station Feldmoching, an important transfer station in the MVV network, where connections to the S1 to Freising/airport and select regional trains to Landshut exist. The metro station is decorated with motifs from the "village idylle" and the urban life of Feldmochings, many shiny materials were used in this interesting and very individual station. In the Hasenbergl subway station, a high, column-free station hall with roomplastics serving as light reflectors was built as a formative station element.

The route of the U2 runs through the railway station Dülferstraße, colorfully designed by Ricarda Dietz, which connects the eastern parts of Hasenbergl as well as the newly built area on the Panzerwiese, which was the end of the U2 between 1993 and 1996. The tunnel portion under the Panzerwiese was developed largely in the open incision, since at the time of construction there was still no development going on. In addition, after the opening of this route, the Tramlinie 12 from Harthof to Scheidplatz was removed and line 13 to Hasenbergl was stopped.

The following station Harthof has a wide opening at the northern end to a ground level in a green area. The next station, Am Hart, is mainly used for the development of commercial and industrial areas. Next to the station is the BMW Research and Innovation Center (FIZ). The Euro-industrial park is connected by a shuttle bus financed by the local companies. There is also a regional bus to Garching-Hochbrück (U). Between Am Hart and Frankfurter Ring in the southern direction, an artist painted white and blue wave patterns on the tunnel wall, shortly after the opening of the route, and which is the only art in the tunnel routes in Munich.

After the Milbertshofen station, the U2 meets the U3 at the four-track station in Scheidplatz, where a direct transfer is possible on the same platform, there is usually a wait in connection time. Through Schwabing and Maxvorstadt, the route goes to the city center through the railway stations Hohenzollernplatz, Josephsplatz, Theresienstraße and Königsplatz. In the Königsplatz station, designed by Josef Wiedemann and Johannes Segieth, replicas of works of art from the neighboring Glyptothek and the Staatliche Antikensammlungen can be found on the subway platform.

At the main station, the U2 meets and continues on the same route as the U1 through the inner city until Kolumbusplatz.

=== North (U1) ===
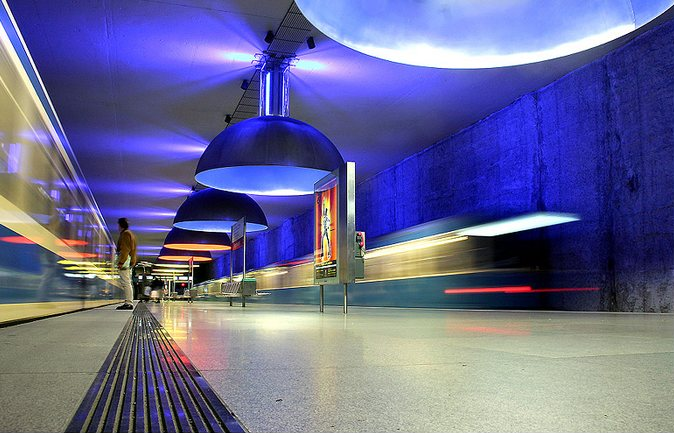
Westfriedhof with an exiting subway

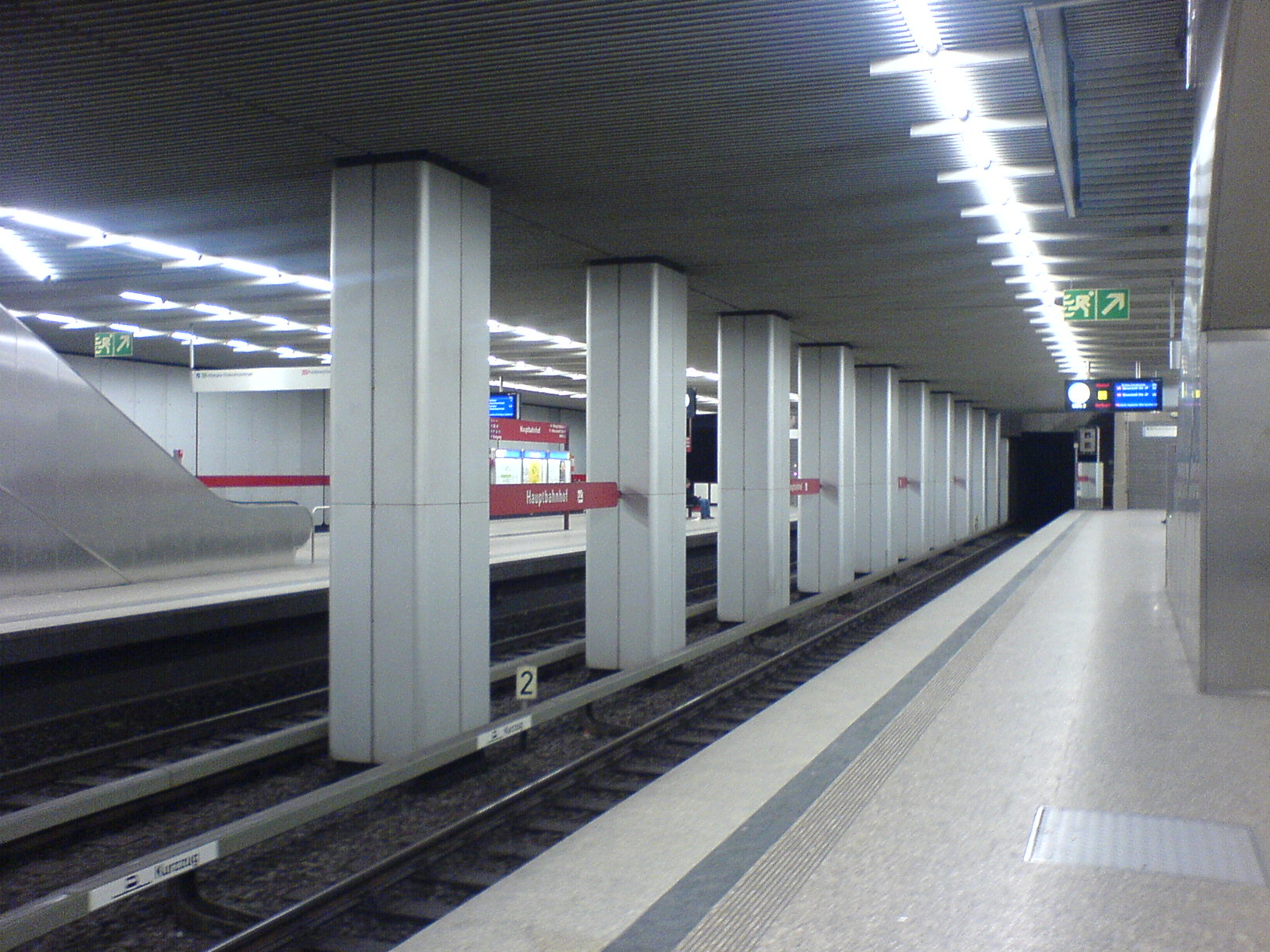
Platform of the U1 and U2 at the main station

Candidplatz

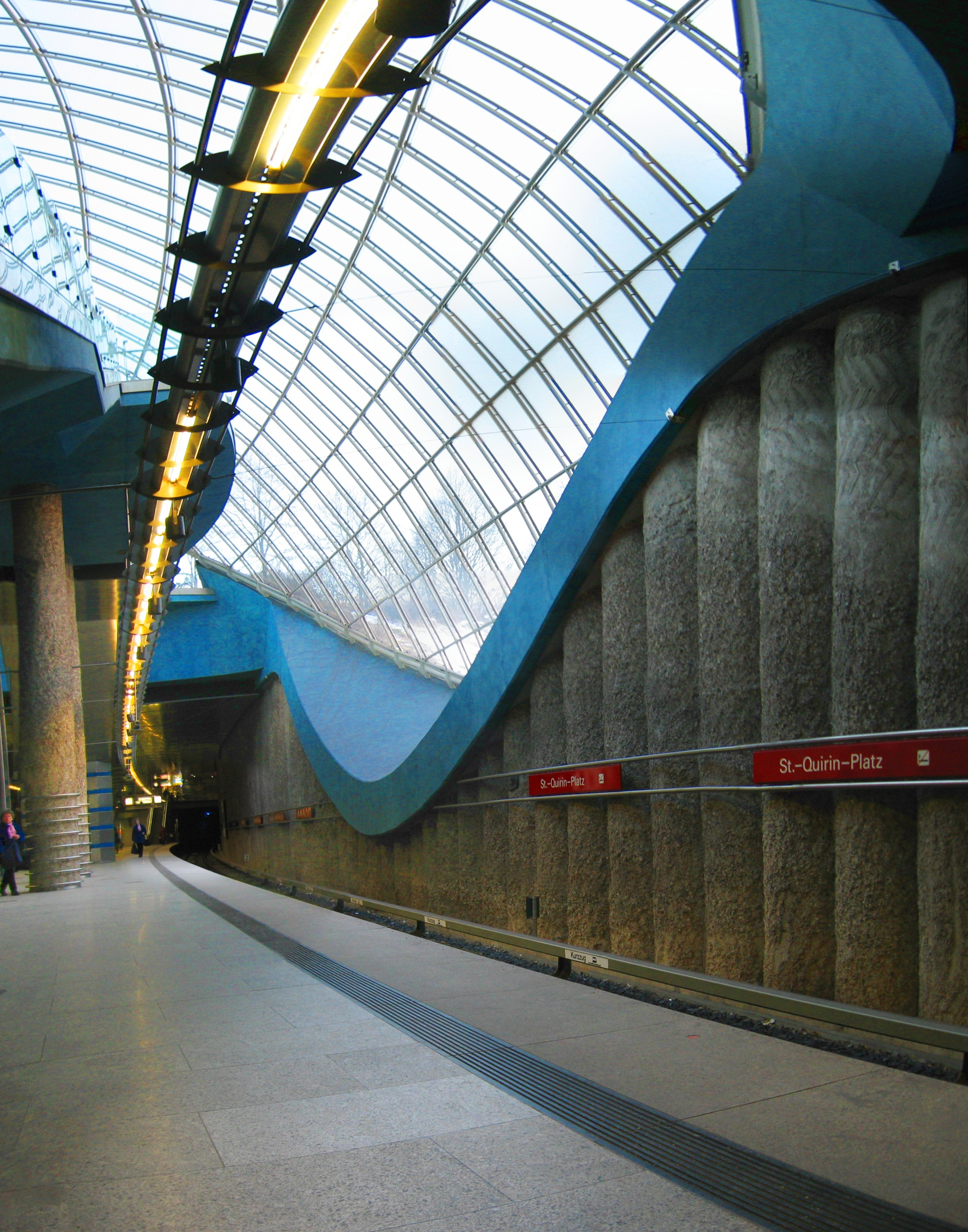
The glass eye at St.-Quirin-Platz

The U1 starts at the Olympia shopping center, where a connection to the U3 is located. It is the only station on the U1 line with side platforms, and has a special feature, a bike + ride parking only for bicycles. The next station Georg-Brauchle-Ring is named after the street on the Mittlerer Ring and shows pictures from all over the world, which are titled "The Great Journey". On the way to the Westfriedhof the route follows the Hanauer Straße. The underground station Westfriedhof is very popular for advertising agencies because of the colorful large lamps and the cave effect. All of these stations opened up the southern connection to the district of Moosach and were terminal stations of the U1. The subway station Gern displays excerpts of the city's history. The next railway station Rotkreuzplatz was the northern endpoint until 1998, and is designed like the Maillingerstraße and Stiglmaierplatz stations, which are located under the Nymphenburger Straße.

=== Center (U1 and U2) ===
Then the U1 reaches the four-track railway main station, where it enters the main route with the U2. There, a connection to the U4 and U5 is found, which run on a floor above, as well as connections to trams, regional trains and long-distance trains. At the Sendlinger Tor station there is also the possibility to change to tramways, and here the U3 and the U6 run on a floor above. The subway station Fraunhoferstraße is dominated by two columns, because the route runs up in the proximity to the Isar in the Schildvortrieb. This is followed by the triple railway station "Kolumbusplatz", where the U1 and U2 separate again.

=== East (U2) ===
From the Kolumbusplatz, the U2 runs through Silberhornstraße and Untersbergstraße to the Giesing station, where there a transfer possibility to the S3 and S7 on the surface is located. Through Karl-Preis-Platz, the U2 runs further to the Innsbrucker Ring, where - as in Scheidplatz - there is usually a direct connection on the same platform to a crossing line, here the U5.

The subsequent, 1990 architecturally designed route, was designed with the motive "Rot", which is found in every station. After the U2 has crossed the station of Josephsburg, it reaches Kreillerstraße, where the wall decoration designed by Michaeli-Gymnasium with brickwork reminds one of the former brickworks in the district of Berg am Laim. The U2 then finally reaches the Trudering station, which is equipped with two single tube platforms with crossbeams. On the surface is a transfer to the S4 and S6 (only during the main traffic time) in the direction Zorneding or Ebersberg possible.

After the Moosfeld station are then only the two stations Messestadt-West and Messestadt-Ost. Directly adjacent to the metro stations is the exhibition grounds to the north and a new residential development to the south, the shopping center Riem Arcaden, as well as the area of the Riemerpark, where the 2005 Bundesgartenschau took place. On the east end of the end station is a special feature: a sundial designed by Blasius Gerg is located on the ceiling, to which its funnel-shaped form brings sunlight downwards.

=== South (U1) ===
The next train station is Candidplatz, which is decorated like a rainbow and in which the colors mix together. Above the Wettersteinplatz station is a cavity, which is planned to be built into residential underground parking, and there is a connection to Tram 25 to Grünwald located there. At the St.-Quirin-Platz station, a glass dome arches over the station, which is also called "the glass eye", making it the most architecturally unique station of the Munich subway. The end station Mangfallplatz is under the Naupliastraße and has oblique walls leading up to the center, due to the narrow conditions on the surface. As an alternative to the metro planning, a tram route from Wettersteinplatz to Mangfallplatz had been considered, in the end the decision for a subway route won. Due to the high construction costs and the comparatively low passenger volume on this section, this decision was often criticized as wrong.

== Operation ==
The operation on the Stammstrecke 2 is now used by the lines U1 and U2, as well as by the amplifier line U7. These lines operate parallelly in the part of the routes located in the city center.

=== U1 ===
Line highlights of the U1

Since the last expansion, which was completed on 31 October 2004, the U1 line has served a distance of 12.2 kilometers and a total of 15 metro stations. All sections and stations are subterranean. Usually, the so-called "six-car long trains" are used on the U1. As a result, all three types of wagons in Munich's subway are also operated here. The existing stations are operated without exceptions in the operating period.

Route of the U1 line
| Driving time | Abbreviation | Metro station | Location | km | Transfer |
|---|---|---|---|---|---|
| 0 | OE | Olympia-Einkaufszentrum | tunnel | 143,7 | Bus |
| 1 | GB | Georg-Brauchle-Ring | tunnel | 144,3 | Bus |
| 2½ | WF | Westfriedhof | tunnel | 145,2 | Munich tramway Bus |
| 4 | GE | Gern | tunnel | 146,0 | |
| 5½ | RO | Rotkreuzplatz | tunnel | 147,0 | Munich tramway Bus |
| 7 | MA | Maillingerstraße | tunnel | 148,0 | |
| 8½ | SM | Stiglmaierplatz | tunnel | 148,9 | Munich tramway |
| 10 | HU | Hauptbahnhof Vorplatz | tunnel | 150,0 | Long distance MVV S Munich tramway Bus |
| 12 | SU | Sendlinger Tor | tunnel | 150,9 | Munich tramway Bus |
| 13½ | FH | Fraunhoferstraße | tunnel | 151,7 | Munich tramway |
| 15 | KO | Kolumbusplatz | tunnel | 152,3/190,3 | Bus |
| 16 | CP | Candidplatz | tunnel | 191,2 | Bus |
| 17½ | WT | Wettersteinplatz | tunnel | 191,9 | Munich tramway |
| 18½ | SQ | St.-Quirin-Platz | tunnel | 192,5 | Bus |
| 20 | ML | Mangfallplatz | tunnel | 193,3 | Bus |

=== U2 ===
Line highlights of the U2

Since the last expansion, which was completed on 29 May 1999, the U2 line serves a distance of 24,377 kilometers and a total of 27 metro stations. All sections and stations are subterranean. In operation, the so-called "six-car long trains" are generally used on the U2. As a result, all three types of wagons in Munich's subway are also operated here. The existing stations are operated without exceptions in the operating period.

Route of the U2 line
| Driving time | Abbreviation | Metro station | Location | km | Transfer |
|---|---|---|---|---|---|
| 0 | FM | Feldmoching | tunnel | 180,0 | MVV S Bus |
| 1½ | HL | Hasenbergl | tunnel | 180,8 | Bus |
| 2½ | DF | Dülferstraße | tunnel | 181,4 | Bus |
| 4 | HF | Harthof | tunnel | 182,5 | Bus |
| 5½ | HA | Am Hart | tunnel | 183,9 | Bus |
| 7 | FF | Frankfurter Ring | tunnel | 184,8 | Bus |
| 8½ | MI | Milbertshofen | tunnel | 185,2 | |
| 10 | SP | Scheidplatz | tunnel | 186,3 | Munich tramway Bus |
| 12 | HZ | Hohenzollernplatz | tunnel | 187,4 | Munich tramway Bus |
| 13 | JO | Josephsplatz | tunnel | 188,1 | Bus |
| 14½ | TH | Theresienstraße | tunnel | 188,7 | |
| 15½ | KN | Königsplatz | tunnel | 189,4 | Bus |
| 17 | HU | Hauptbahnhof | tunnel | 190,0/150,0 | Long distance MVV S Munich tramway Bus |
| 19 | SU | Sendlinger Tor | tunnel | 150,9 | Munich tramway Bus |
| 20½ | FH | Fraunhoferstraße | tunnel | 151,7 | Munich tramway |
| 22 | KO | Kolumbusplatz | tunnel | 152,8 | Bus |
| 23 | SI | Silberhornstraße | tunnel | 153,5 | Straßenbahn 15, 25 und N27 Bus 58 |
| 24½ | UB | Untersbergstraße | tunnel | 154,0 | |
| 25½ | GG | Giesing | tunnel | 154,7 | S Munich tramway Bus |
| 27½ | KP | Karl-Preis-Platz | tunnel | 156,0 | Bus |
| 29 | IR | Innsbrucker Ring | tunnel | 156,9/280,0 | Munich U-Bahn |
| 31 | JB | Josephsburg | tunnel | 281,6 | Bus |
| 32½ | KR | Kreillerstraße | tunnel | 282,6 | Munich tramway |
| 34 | TR | Trudering | tunnel | 283,7 | S Bus |
| 35½ | MF | Moosfeld | tunnel | 284,7 | |
| 37½ | ME | Messestadt West | tunnel | 286,3 | Bus |
| 39 | MS | Messestadt Ost | tunnel | 287,2 | Bus |

=== U7 ===
Line highlights of the U7

Since 12 December 2011, the U7 reinforcement line has been running during the high traffic times from Westfriedhof to Neuperlach Zentrum. It runs between Westfriedhof and Kolumbusplatz on the U1 line, between Hauptbahnhof and Innsbrucker Ring it runs on the U2 line. At the Innsbrucker Ring station, it turns off onto the main train line 3. In operation, so-called full-powers train with four wagons are usually used on the U7, which is why only the wagon types A and B operate. During the holidays, the line runs only in the section from Westfriedhof to Sendlinger Tor

Route of the U7 line
| Driving time | Abbreviation | Metro station | Location | km | Transfer |
|---|---|---|---|---|---|
| 0 | WF | Westfriedhof | tunnel | 145,2 | Munich tramway Bus |
| 1½ | GE | Gern | tunnel | 146,0 | Munich U-Bahn |
| 3 | RO | Rotkreuzplatz | tunnel | 147,0 | Munich tramway Bus |
| 4½ | MA | Maillingerstraße | tunnel | 148,0 | Munich U-Bahn |
| 6 | SM | Stiglmaierplatz | tunnel | 148,9 | Munich tramway |
| 7½ | HU | Hauptbahnhof | tunnel | 150,0 | Long distance MVV S Munich tramway Bus |
| 9½ | SU | Sendlinger Tor | tunnel | 150,9 | Munich tramway Bus |
| 11 | FH | Fraunhoferstraße | tunnel | 151,7 | Munich tramway Bus |
| 12½ | KO | Kolumbusplatz | tunnel | 152,8 | Bus |
| 13½ | SI | Silberhornstraße | tunnel | 153,5 | Straßenbahn 15, 25 und N27 Bus 58 |
| 15 | UB | Untersbergstraße | tunnel | 154,0 | Munich U-Bahn |
| 16 | GG | Giesing | tunnel | 154,7 | S Munich tramway Bus |
| 18 | KP | Karl-Preis-Platz | tunnel | 156,0 | Bus |
| 19½ | IR | Innsbrucker Ring | tunnel | 156,9 | Munich U-Bahn |
| 21 | MC | Michaelibad | tunnel | 157,9 | Bus |
| 23 | QI | Quiddestraße | tunnel | 159,6 | Bus |
| 24 | NZ | Neuperlach Zentrum | tunnel | 160,3 | Bus |

=== U8 ===
Line highlights of the U8

Since 15 December 2013, the amplifier line U8 runs from the Olympia center, via the main station, to the Sendlinger Tor on Saturdays. At Scheidplatz, it turns off from the Stammstrecke 1 to the Stammstrecke 2 and goes to Sendlinger Tor parallel to the U2. Therefore, the journeys between Olympiazentrum and Sendlinger Tor, which have already taken place for some time on Saturdays, have their own line number. The line runs on, a since 1980 to 1988 section of the U8 (now U2), which runs from the Olympia center via the Sendlinger Tor to Neuperlach South.

== Planning ==
=== Route of the U1 ===
Plans to extend the U1 from Mangfallplatz via the Harlaching hospital to the Großhesseloher bridge did not have any real chances in 2011 because of the tense budget situation. The extension of the U1 to the Solln station, which would require a new isar crossing and would link the U1 to the S-Bahn line S7 in Solln, was seen as an option in the Munich city council in 2015 and is now to be examined with the pending update of the urban transport plan. Likewise, the project to extend the U1 north from the Olympia shopping center to the S-Bahn station Fasanerie was rejected because there is a connection between subway and suburban train, both at Feldmoching station, north of the Fasanerie, as well as at the southern Moosach station.

=== Route of the U2 ===
A further extension of the U2 to the east, in the direction of Feldkirchen, would be possible, but will not be applied in the medium term, since Feldkirchen is currently sufficiently connected by the S-Bahn to the Munich city center.

Under the working title U26, the option of a stretching route from the Am Hart station to Fröttmaning (U6), which could also be used to improve the development of the Allianz Arena, is being investigated in the "Verkehrskonzept Münchner Norden". There is also the consideration of a tram connection between the subway stations Am Hart (U2) and the Kieferngarten (U6).
