= List of Munich U-Bahn stations =

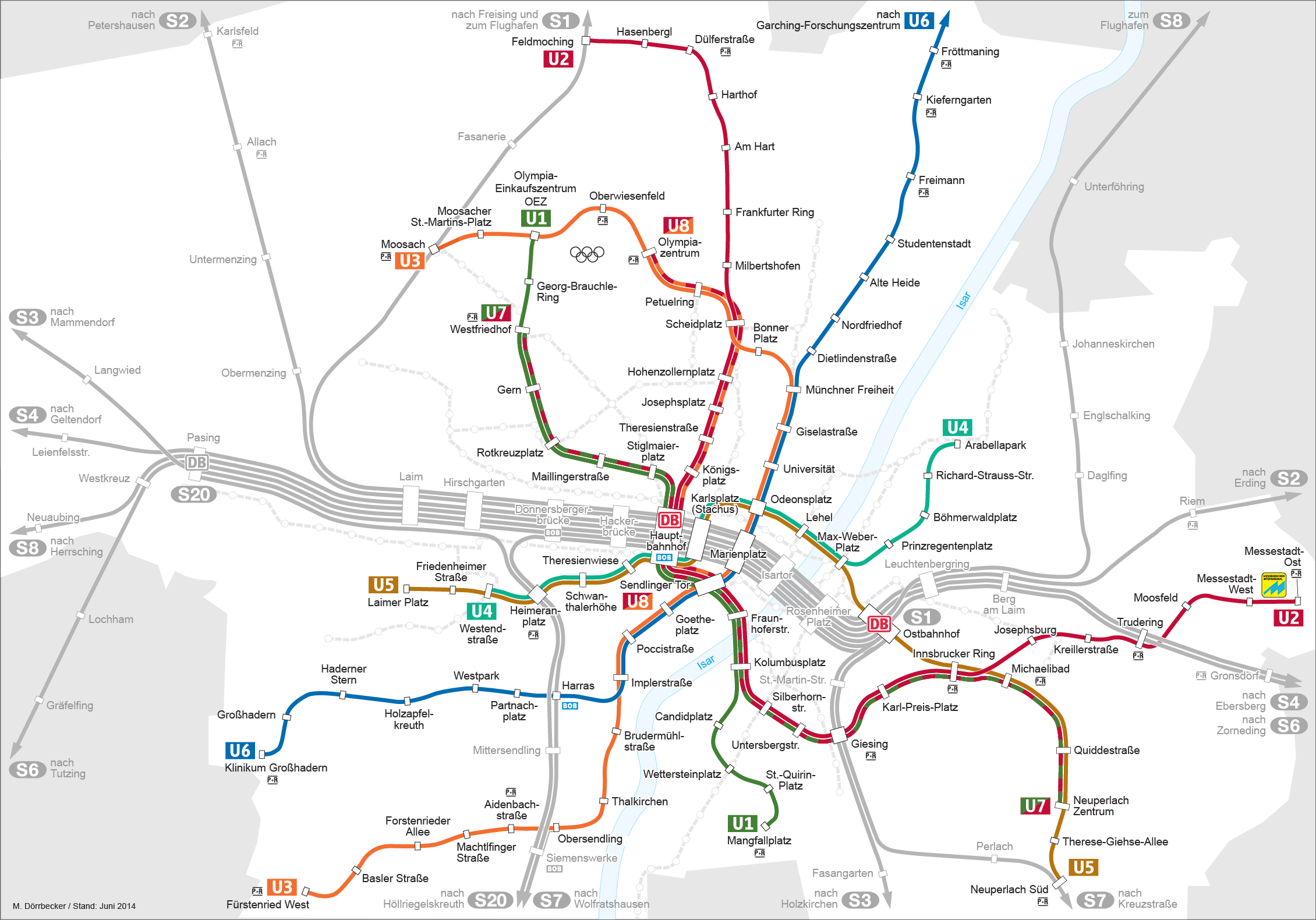
Topographical map of the Munich U-Bahn system

The Munich U-Bahn is a public rapid transit system serving the city of Munich and surrounding communities. The system is operated by the Münchner Verkehrsgesellschaft (MVG, "Munich Transport Company") and served over 375 million passengers per year in 2012. It is made up of eight lines, running over 95 kilometres (59 mi) of route.

The Munich U-Bahn currently has 100 stations. (if four connecting/transfer stations are counted twice; there are 96 stations counting all stations once): 94 are underground and 6 are on the surface or elevated. Only three stations are located outside the Munich city limits: Garching, Garching-Forschungszentrum, and Garching-Hochbrück are all located in the northern suburb of Garching.

== Stations ==
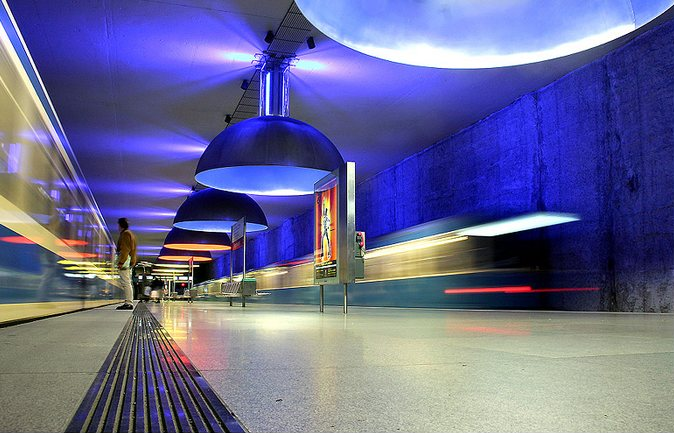
Westfriedhof station platform

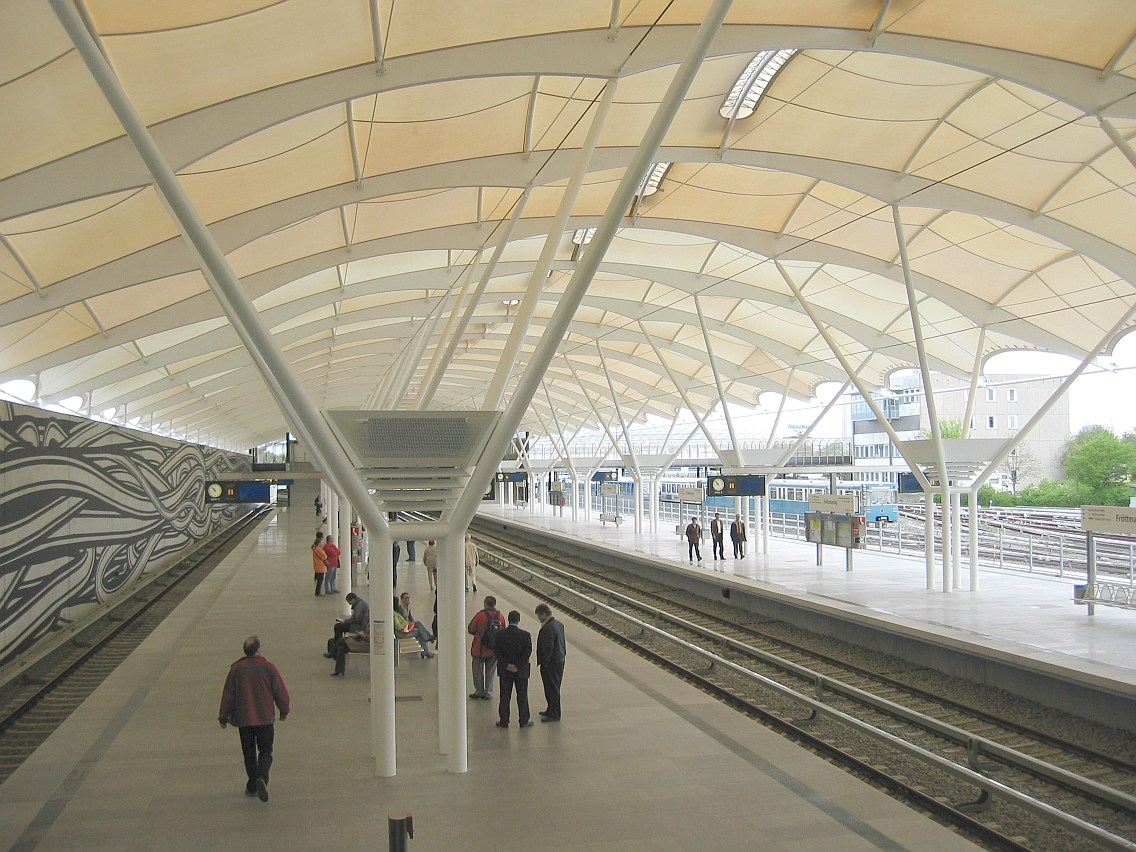
A view of the Fröttmaning station platform. The rail yard for the engineering base can be seen on the right.

A view of the Georg-Brauchle-Ring station platform

Garching station platform

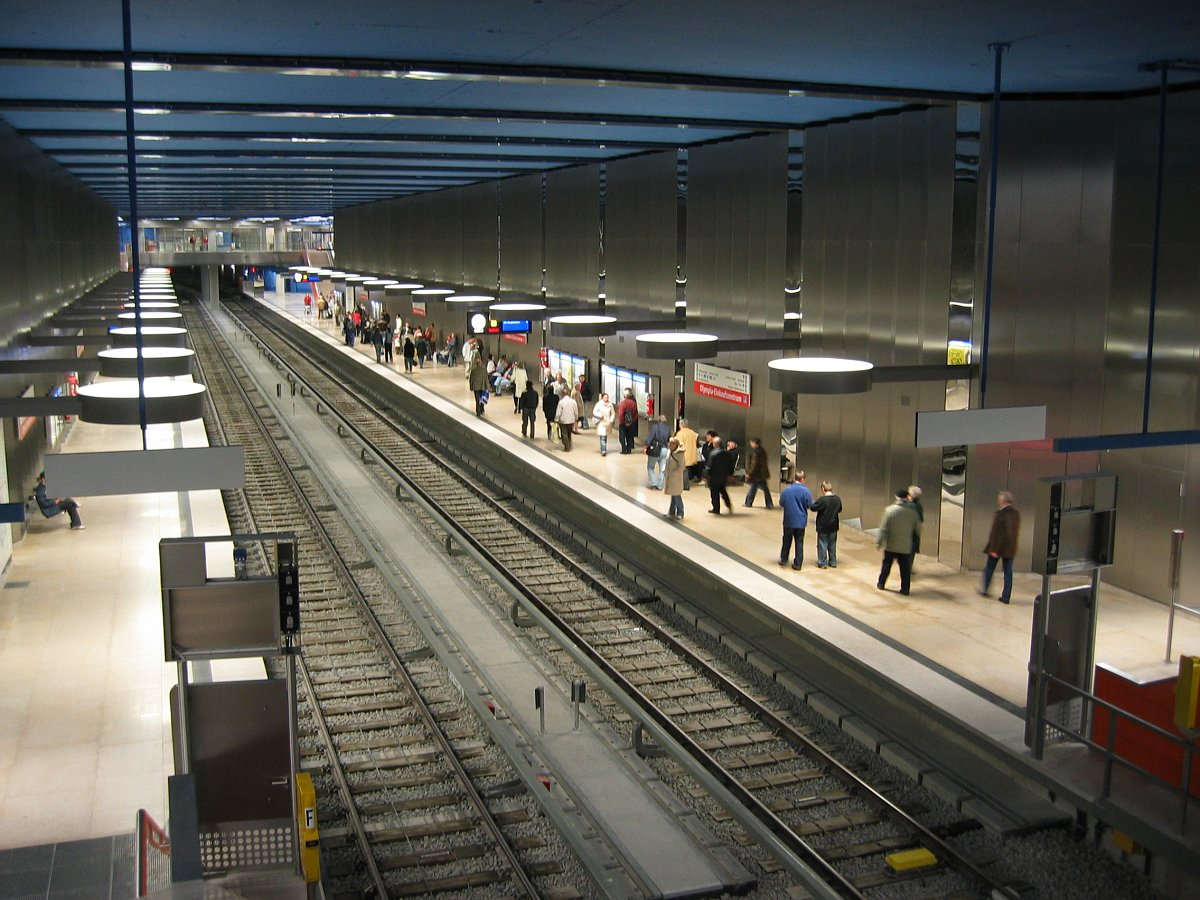
A view of the Olympia-Einkaufszentrum station platform (U1)

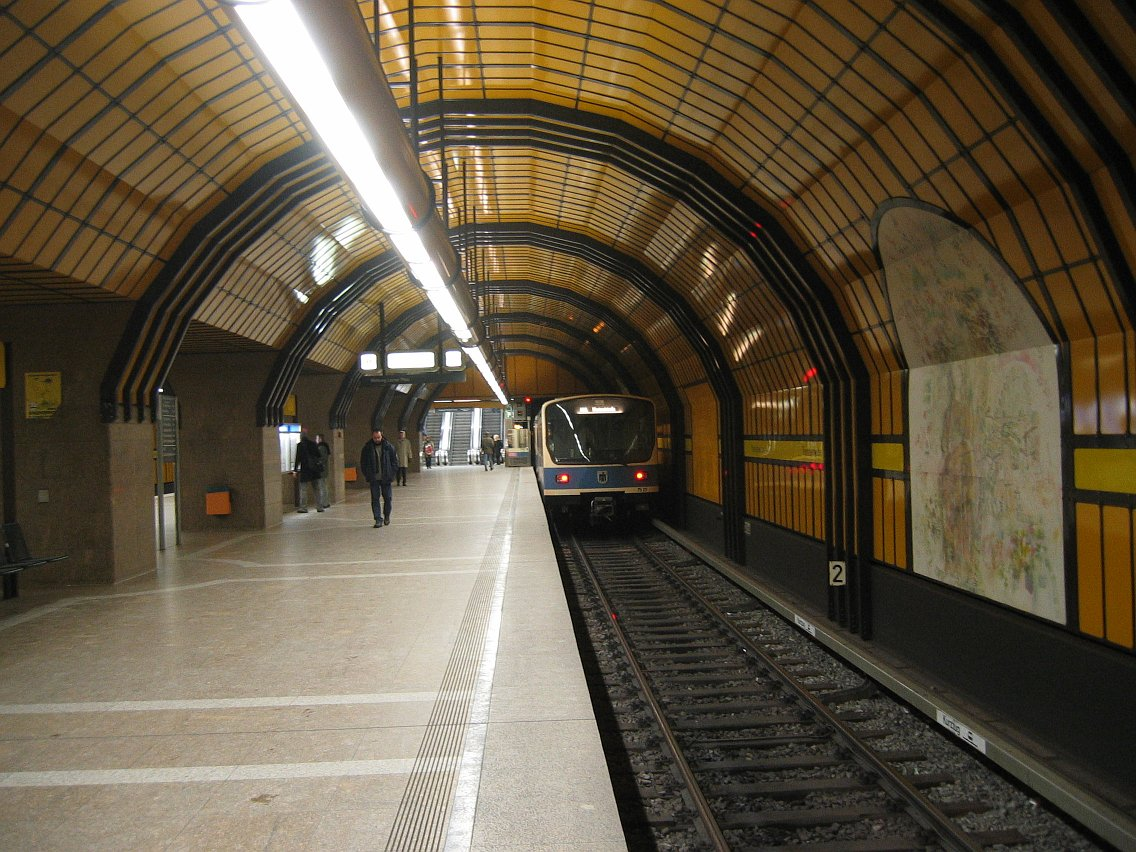
Theresienwiese station platform

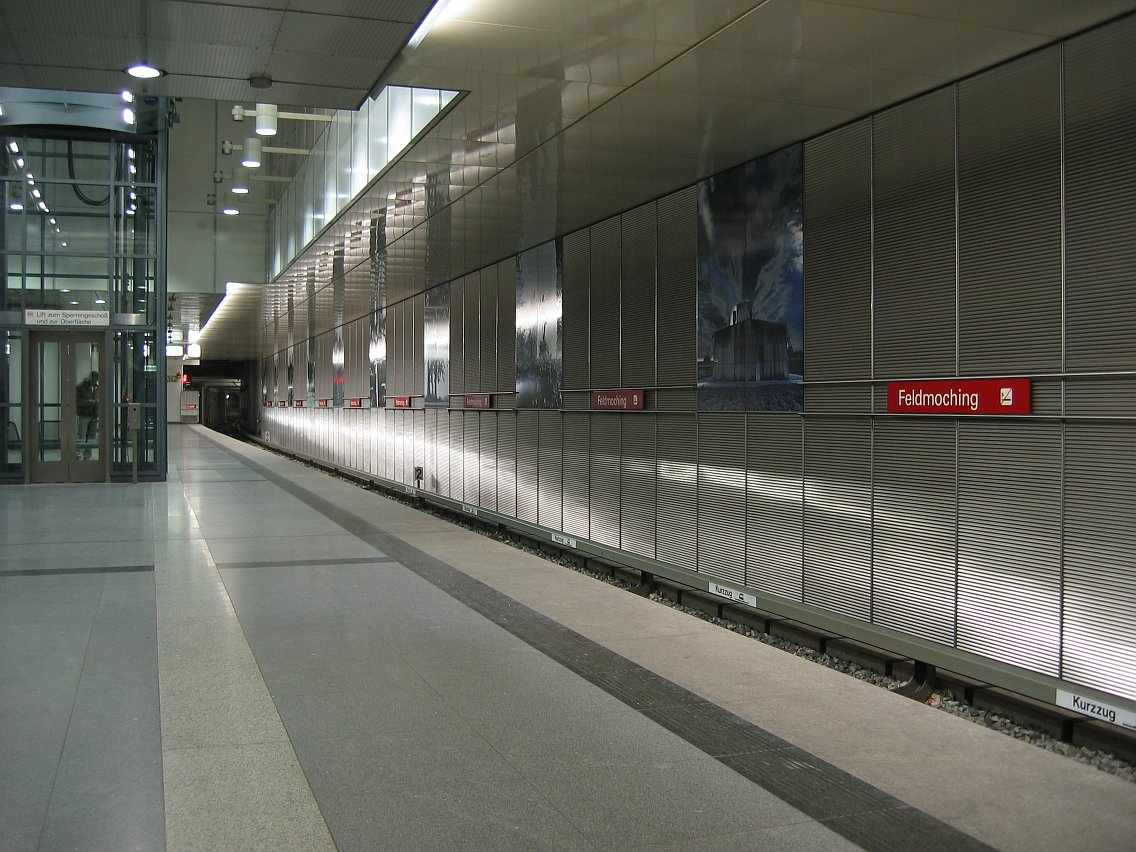
Feldmoching station platform

Candidplatz station platform

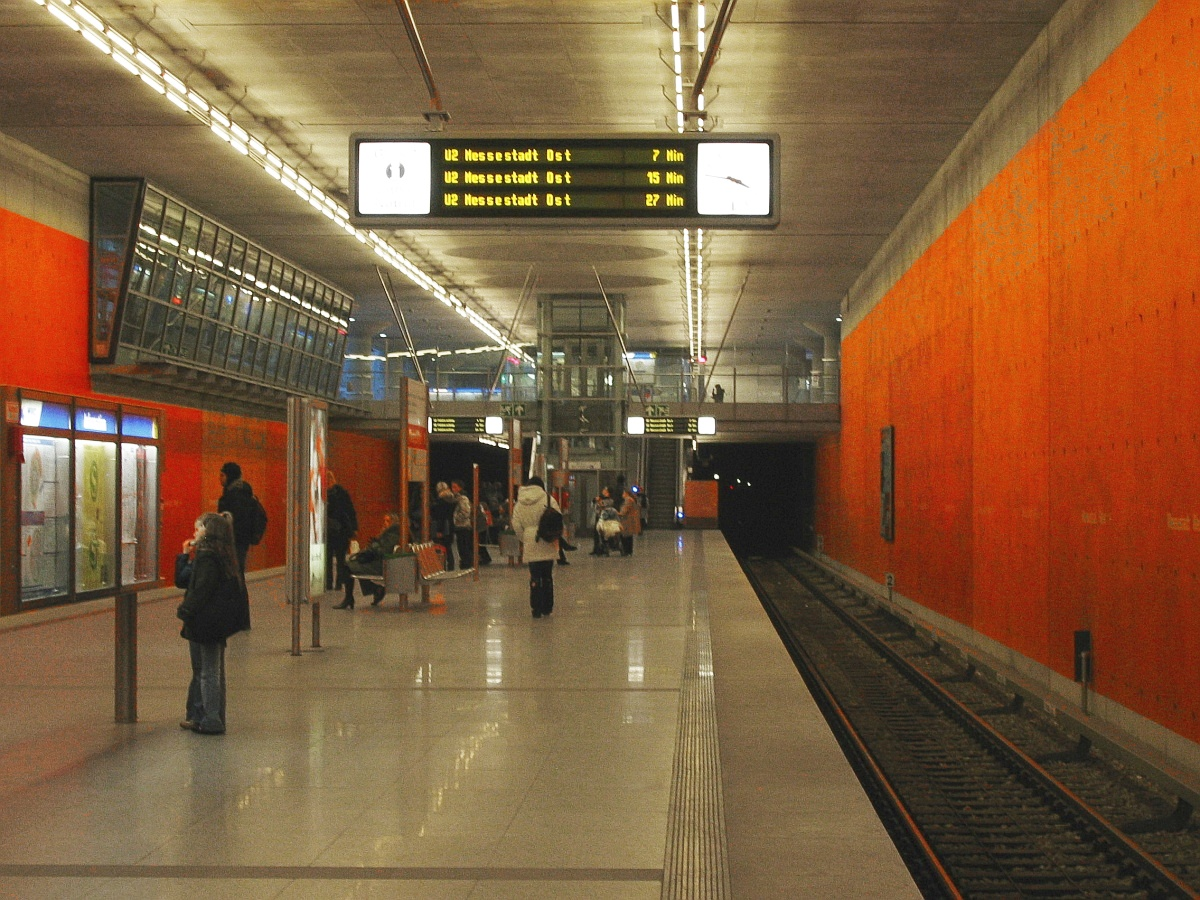
Messestadt West station platform

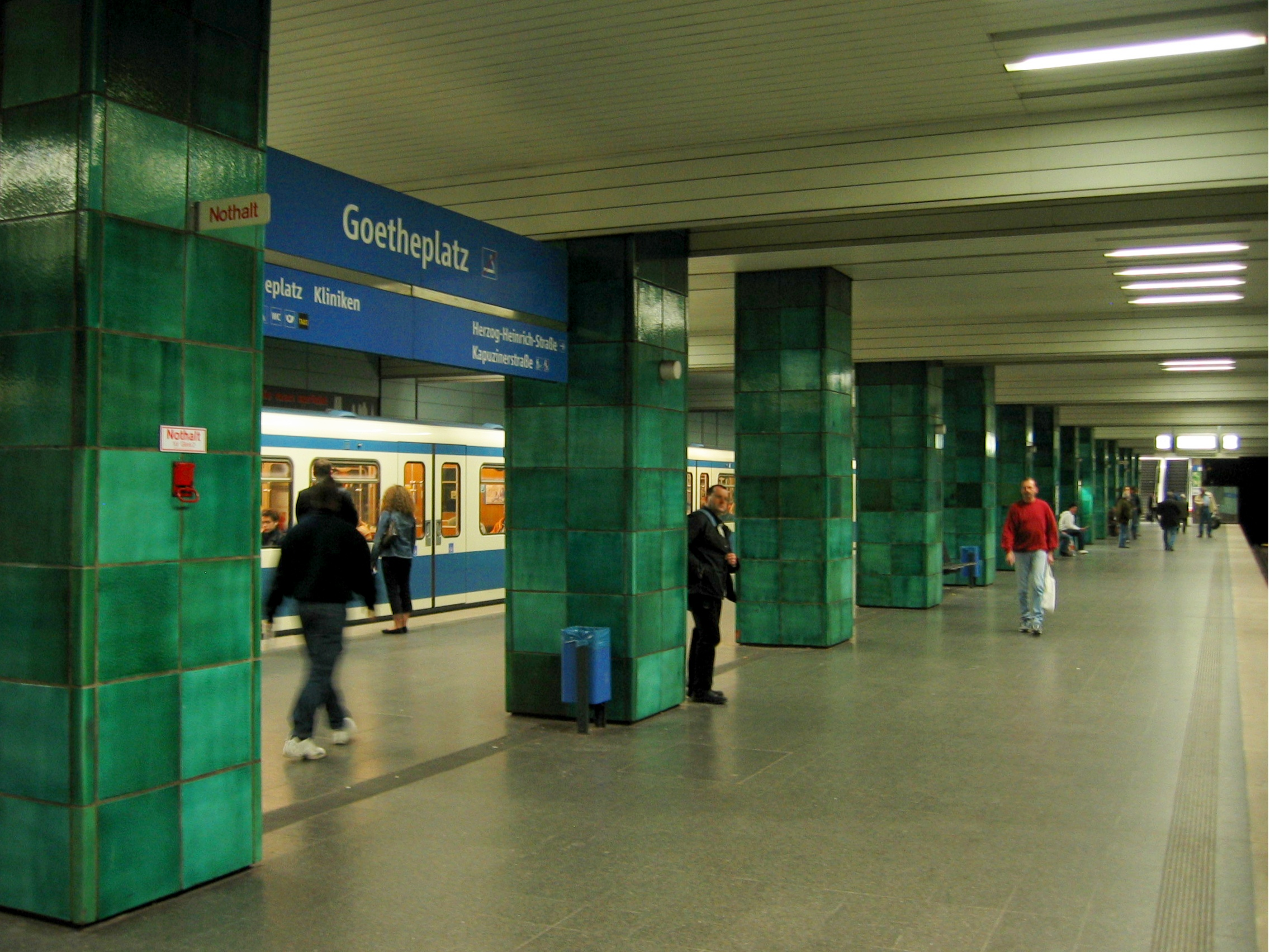
Goetheplatz station platform

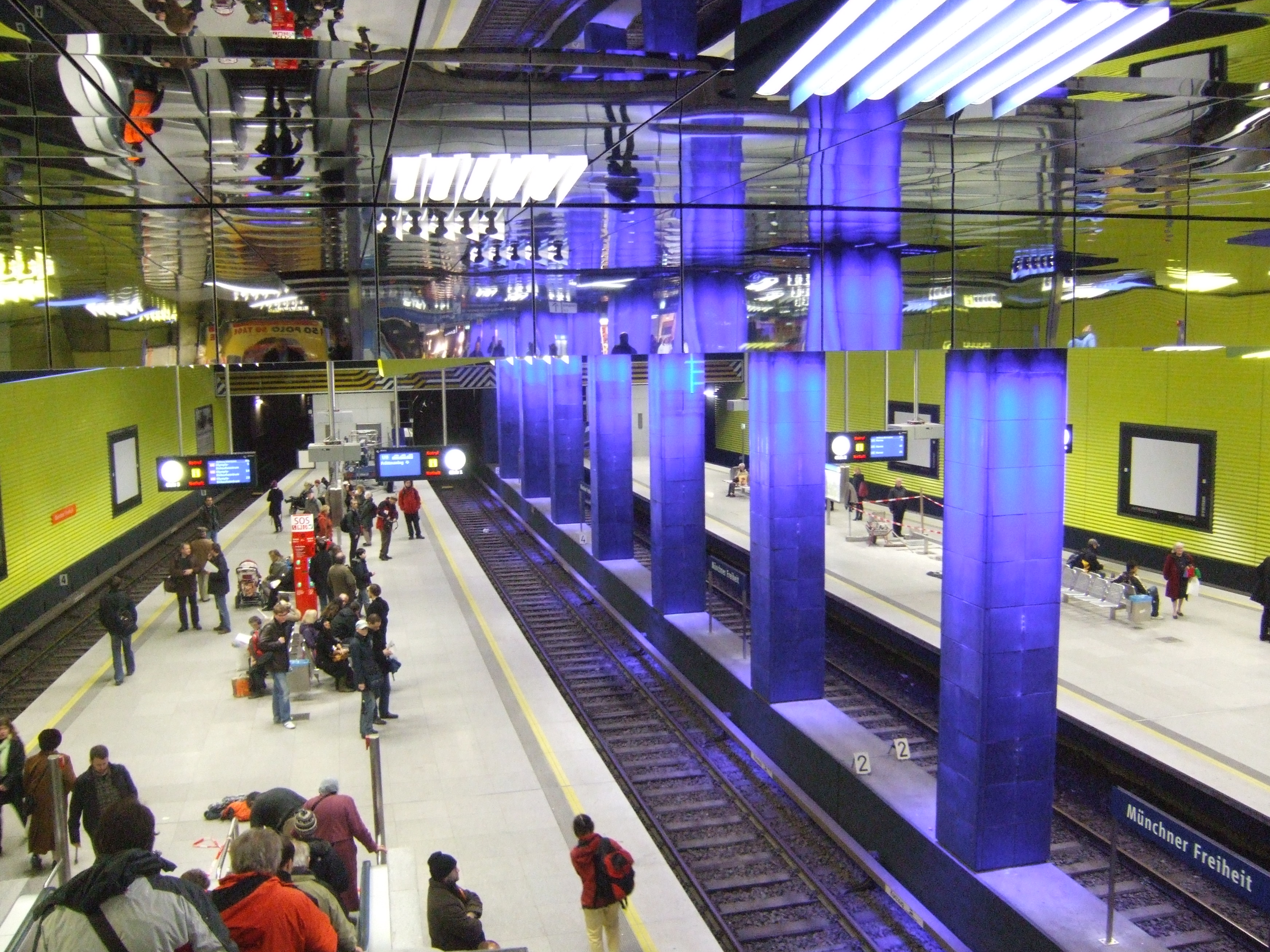
Münchner Freiheit station platform

*	Transfer stations
†	Terminals
**	Transfer station and terminal

Station	Lines	Opened
Aidenbachstraße	U3	28 October 1989
Alte Heide	U6	19 October 1971
Am Hart	U2	20 November 1993
Arabellapark†	U4	27 October 1988
Basler Straße	U3	1 June 1991
Böhmerwaldplatz	U4	27 October 1988
Bonner Platz	U3	8 May 1972
Brudermühlstraße	U3	28 October 1989
Candidplatz	U1	8 November 1997
Dietlindenstraße	U6	19 October 1971
Dülferstraße	U2	20 November 1993
Feldmoching†	U2	26 October 1996
Forstenrieder Allee	U3	28 October 1989
Frankfurter Ring	U2	20 November 1993
Fraunhoferstraße	U1 U2	18 October 1980
Freimann	U6	19 October 1971
Friedenheimer Straße	U5	24 March 1988
Fröttmaning	U6	30 June 1994
Fürstenried West†	U3	1 June 1991
Garching	U6	14 October 2006
Garching-Forschungszentrum†	U6	14 October 2006
Garching-Hochbrück	U6	28 October 1995
Georg-Brauchle-Ring	U1	18 October 2003
Gern	U1	23 May 1998
Giesing	U2	18 October 1980
Giselastraße	U3 U6	19 October 1971
Goetheplatz	U3 U6	19 October 1971
Großhadern	U6	22 May 1993
Haderner Stern	U6	22 May 1993
Harras	U6	22 November 1975
Harthof	U2	20 November 1993
Hasenbergl	U2	26 October 1996
Hauptbahnhof*	U1 U2; U4 U5	18 October 1980
Heimeranplatz	U4 U5	10 March 1984
Hohenzollernplatz	U2	18 October 1980
Holzapfelkreuth	U6	15 April 1983
Implerstraße*	U3 U6	22 November 1975
Innsbrucker Ring*	U2 U5	18 October 1980
Josephsburg	U2	29 May 1999
Josephsplatz	U2	18 October 1980
Karl-Preis-Platz	U2	18 October 1980
Karlsplatz (Stachus)	U4 U5	10 March 1984
Kieferngarten	U6	19 October 1971
Klinikum Großhadern†	U6	22 May 1993
Kolumbusplatz*	U1 U2	18 October 1980
Königsplatz	U2	18 October 1980
Kreillerstraße	U2	29 May 1999
Laimer Platz†	U5	24 March 1988
Lehel	U4 U5	27 October 1988
Machtlfinger Straße	U3	28 October 1989
Maillingerstraße	U1	8 May 1983
Mangfallplatz†	U1	8 November 1997
Marienplatz	U3 U6	19 October 1971
Max-Weber-Platz*	U4 U5	27 October 1988
Messestadt Ost†	U2	29 May 1999
Messestadt West	U2	29 May 1999
Michaelibad	U5	18 October 1980
Milbertshofen	U2	20 November 1993
Moosach†	U3	11 December 2010
Moosacher St.-Martins-Platz	U3	11 December 2010
Moosfeld	U2	29 May 1999
Münchner Freiheit*	U3 U6	19 October 1971
Neuperlach Süd†	U5	18 October 1980
Neuperlach Zentrum	U5	18 October 1980
Nordfriedhof	U6	19 October 1971
Obersendling	U3	28 October 1989
Oberwiesenfeld	U3	28 October 2007
Odeonsplatz*	U3 U6; U4 U5	19 October 1971
Olympia-Einkaufszentrum**	U1 U3	31 October 2004
Olympiazentrum	U3	8 May 1972
Ostbahnhof	U5	27 October 1988
Partnachplatz	U6	15 April 1983
Petuelring	U3	8 May 1972
Poccistraße	U3 U6	28 May 1978
Prinzregentenplatz	U4	27 October 1988
Quiddestraße	U5	18 October 1980
Richard-Strauss-Straße	U4	27 October 1988
Rotkreuzplatz	U1	8 May 1983
Scheidplatz*	U2 U3	8 May 1972
Schwanthalerhöhe	U4 U5	10 March 1984
Sendlinger Tor*	U1 U2; U3 U6	19 October 1971
Silberhornstraße	U2	18 October 1980
St.-Quirin-Platz	U1	8 November 1997
Stiglmaierplatz	U1	8 May 1983
Studentenstadt	U6	19 October 1971
Thalkirchen	U3	28 October 1989
Therese-Giehse-Allee	U5	18 October 1980
Theresienstraße	U2	18 October 1980
Theresienwiese	U4 U5	10 March 1984
Trudering	U2	29 May 1999
Universität	U3 U6	19 October 1971
Untersbergstraße	U2	18 October 1980
Westendstraße†	U4 U5	10 March 1984
Westfriedhof	U1	23 May 1998
Westpark	U6	15 April 1983
Wettersteinplatz	U1	8 November 1997
