= Westfriedhof station =

Station of the Munich U-Bahn

Coordinates: 48°10′14″N 11°31′42″E

Westfriedhof
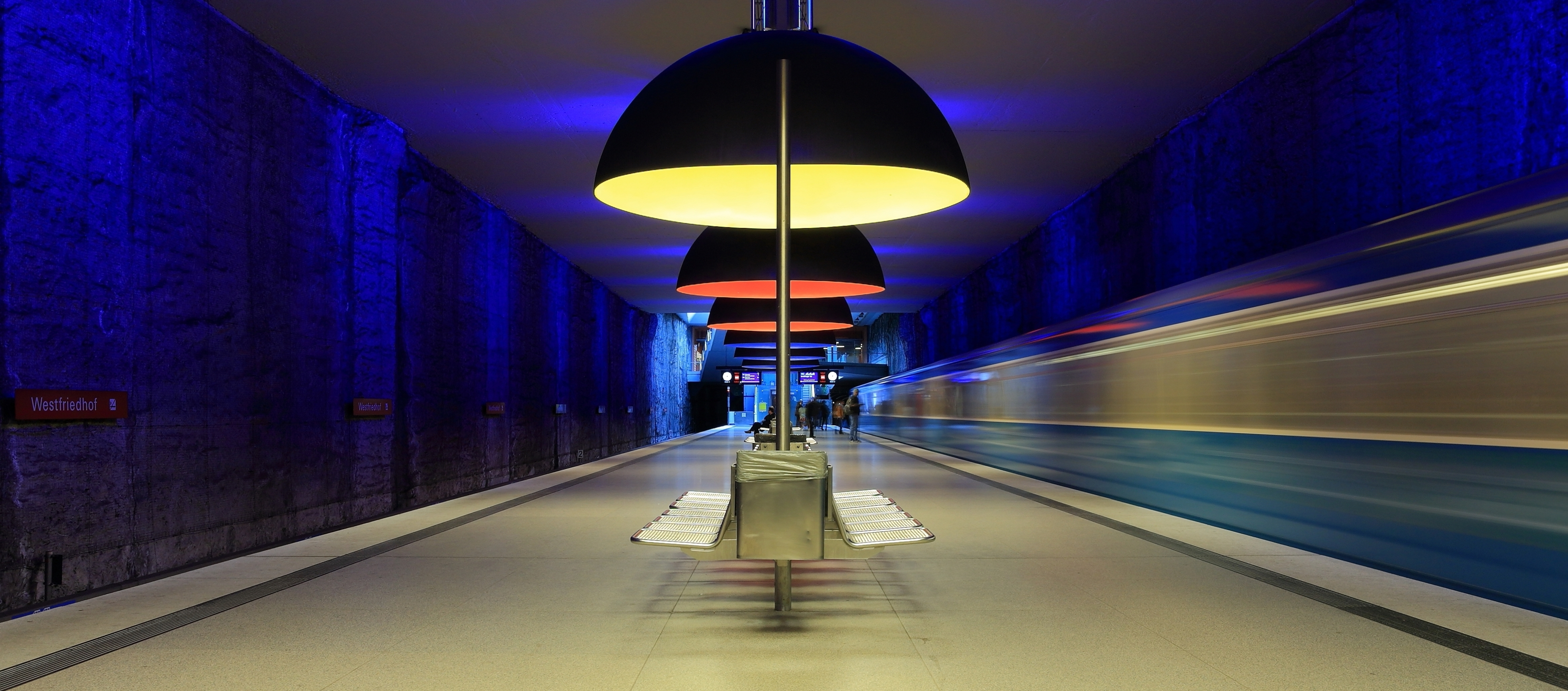
- 2014

General information
- Location: Orpheusstraße; 80992 Munich; Bavaria (Germany)
- Owner: Stadtwerke München
- Operator: Münchner Verkehrsgesellschaft
- Platforms: 1 island platform
- Tracks: 2
- Train operators: Münchner Verkehrsgesellschaft
- Connections: 151 164 165 180 N71

Construction
- Structure type: Underground
- Parking: Yes
- Cycle facilities: Yes
- Accessible: Yes

Other information
- Fare zone: : M

History
- Opened: 24 May 1998; 28 years ago

Services
Preceding station	Munich U-Bahn	Following station
Georg-Brauchle-Ring towards Olympia-Einkaufszentrum	U1	Gern towards Mangfallplatz
Georg-Brauchle-Ring towards Olympia-Einkaufszentrum	U7	Gern towards Neuperlach Zentrum
Location
- Location within Bavaria Location within Germany Location within Europe

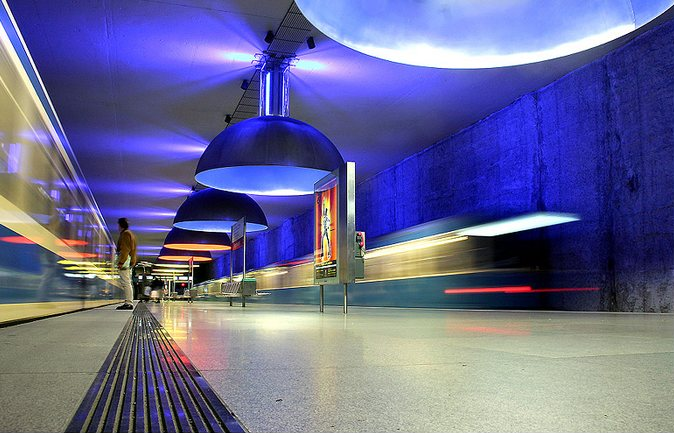
Westfriedhof station platform.

Westfriedhof is an U-Bahn station in Munich on the U1 line of the Munich U-Bahn system, it opened on 24 May 1998, the extension onwards to Georg-Brauchle-Ring was completed in 2003. It is located in the course of the second main line on the border between the Munich districts Neuhausen-Nymphenburg and Moosach.

The station built below Orpheusstraße was opened to traffic on 24 May 1998. The subway station is served by the subway line. Since 12 December 2011, it has also been the terminus of the reinforcement line, which only runs during rush hours. There is a link with other Munich public transport lines at above-ground tram stops.

From 1998 to 2003 it was the terminus of the line and is the terminus of tram line. Because of its lighting design, it is occasionally used as a photo motif by advertising agencies and the special atmosphere has also been used as a record cover. The light comes from eleven lamps, each 3.80 metres in diameter, which have luminaires in blue, red and yellow. At the western end sunlight falls in. This divides the platform into different colours. Together with the rough walls, the station is reminiscent of a cave. Originally, the architect had planned a glass pane in front of the walls, but he liked it better that way. However, the walls had to be secured with a steel net in 2003, as individual pieces had loosened from the wall time and again. The barrier storey can be reached by rolling stairs, fixed staircases and a lift. From there you can also get to the surface by means of rolling and fixed stairs and a lift, where there is a connection to the tram line to Moosach and to the tram lines and in the direction of the city centre.

== See also ==
- List of Munich U-Bahn stations
