= Sendlinger Tor station =

Station of the Munich U-Bahn

Sendlinger Tor
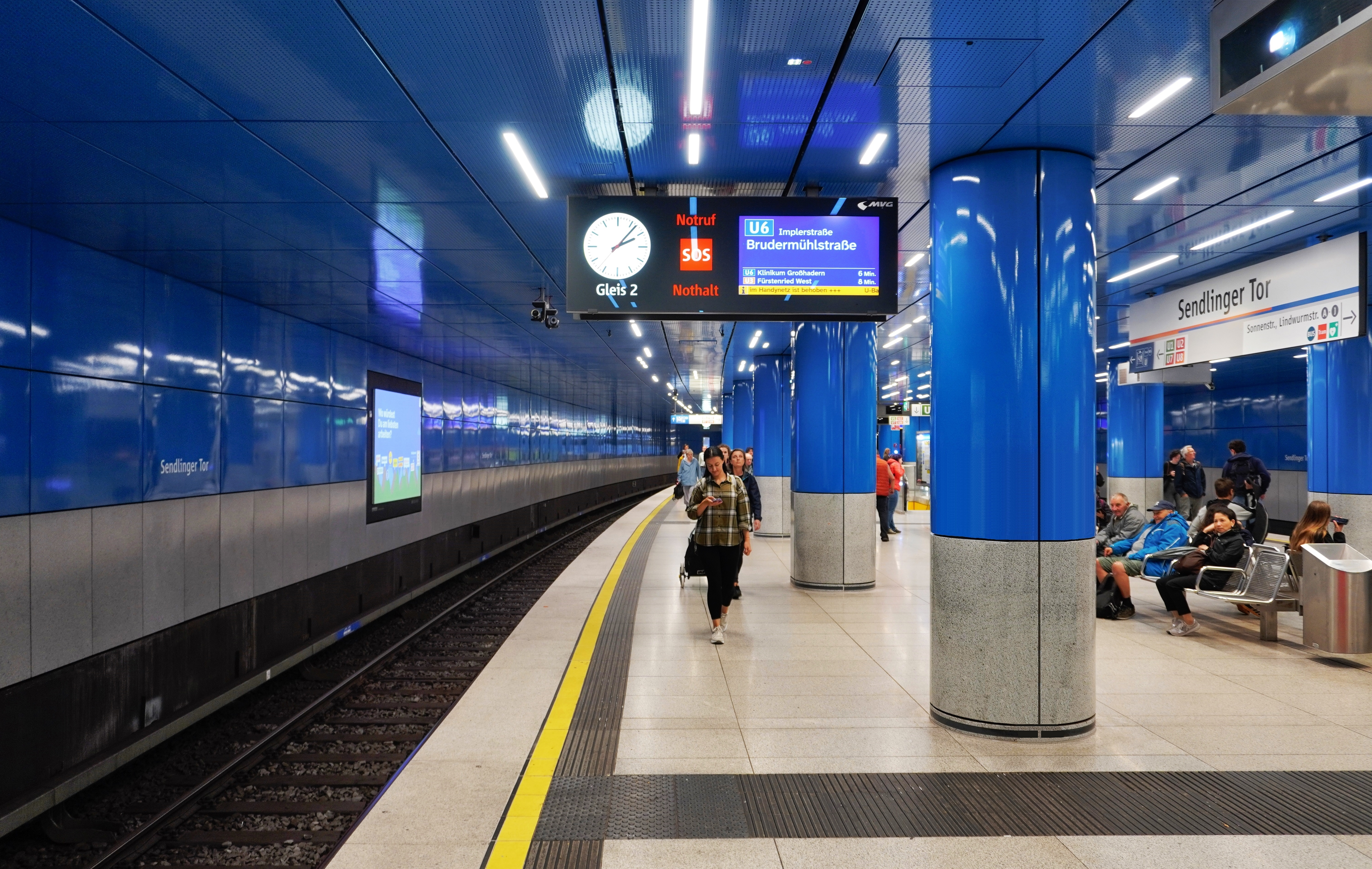
- Platform for lines U3 and U6

General information
- Location: Ludwigsvorstadt-Isarvorstadt; Munich, Germany
- Coordinates: 48°08′00″N 11°33′59″E
- Platforms: Island platform
- Tracks: 4
- Connections: 16 17 18 27 28; MVV buses

Construction
- Structure type: Underground
- Accessible: Yes

Other information
- Fare zone: : M

History
- Opened: 19 October 1971; 54 years ago

Services
Preceding station	Munich U-Bahn	Following station
Hauptbahnhof towards Olympia-Einkaufszentrum	U1	Fraunhoferstraße towards Mangfallplatz
Hauptbahnhof towards Feldmoching	U2	Fraunhoferstraße towards Messestadt Ost
Goetheplatz towards Fürstenried West	U3	Marienplatz towards Moosach
Goetheplatz towards Klinikum Großhadern	U6	Marienplatz towards Garching-Forschungszentrum
Hauptbahnhof towards Olympia-Einkaufszentrum	U7	Fraunhoferstraße towards Neuperlach Zentrum
Hauptbahnhof towards Olympiazentrum	U8	Fraunhoferstraße towards Neuperlach Zentrum
Location
- Location within Bavaria Location within Germany Location within Europe

Sendlinger Tor is an U-Bahn station in the city center of Munich at a junction of the lines U1/2/7 and U3/6 line of the Munich U-Bahn system. It was opened on 19 October 1971 (upper level, U3 and U6) and 18 October 1980 (lower level, U1, U2 and U7).

Above ground, the station is served by routes 16, 17, 18 and 27 of the Munich tramway.

== Gallery ==
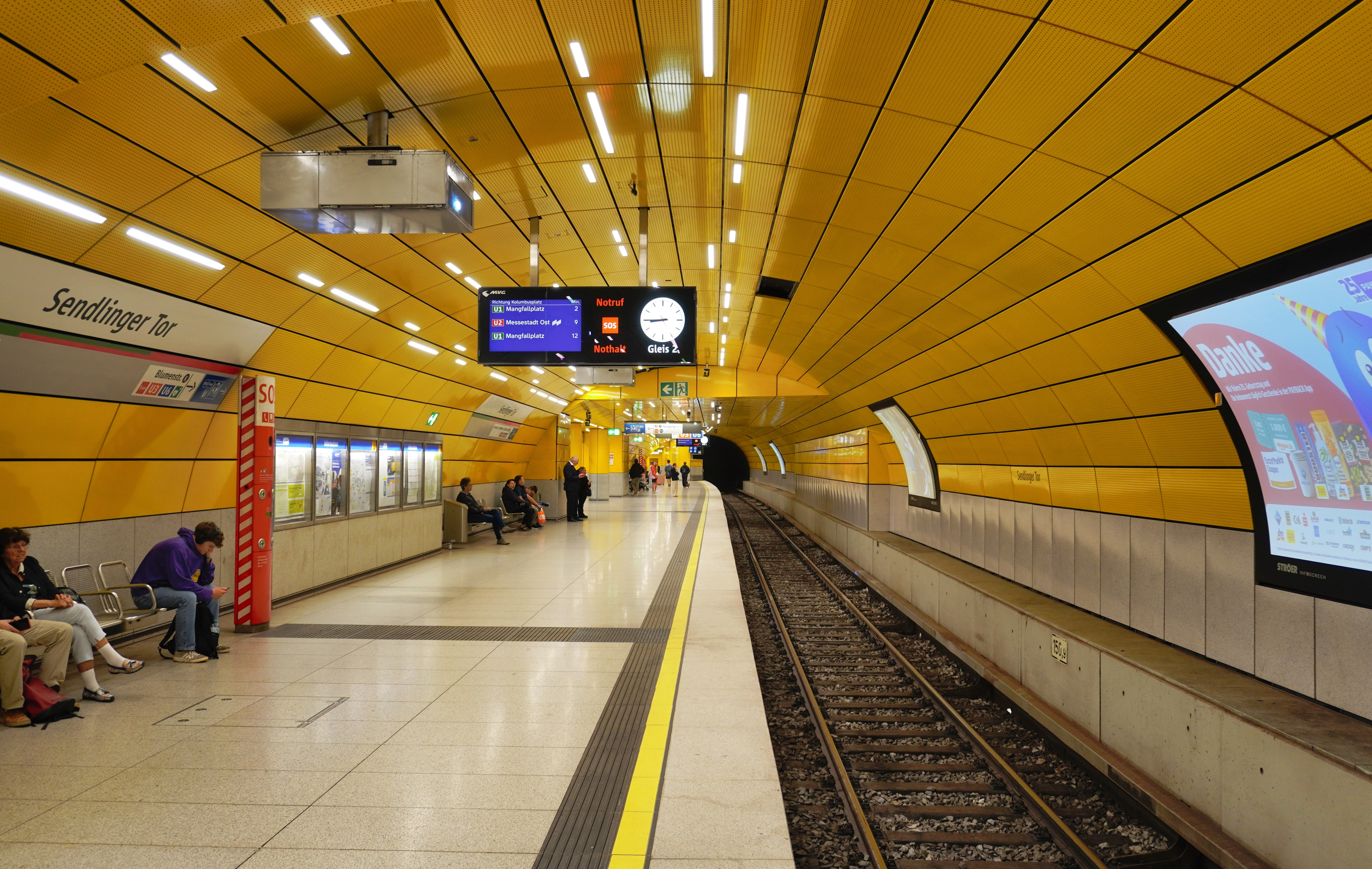
U1/U2/U7/U8 platform

== See also ==
- List of Munich U-Bahn stations
