= Candidplatz station =

Station of the Munich U-Bahn

Coordinates: 48°06′43″N 11°34′16″E

Candidplatz

General information
- Owner: Münchner Verkehrsgesellschaft
- Operator: Münchner Verkehrsgesellschaft
- Connections: Bus

Construction
- Structure type: Underground
- Accessible: Yes

Other information
- Fare zone: : M

History
- Opened: 9 November 1997; 28 years ago

Services
Preceding station	Munich U-Bahn	Following station
Kolumbusplatz towards Olympia-Einkaufszentrum	U1	Wettersteinplatz towards Mangfallplatz
Location

Candidplatz is an U-Bahn station in Munich on the U1 line of the Munich U-Bahn system. The station is named for the Flemish mannerist painter Peter Candid, who entered employ in Munich in 1586, producing notable artworks for the Munich Residenz. The station is notable for the decorative scheme applied to the outer walls, which evoke a rainbow.

== See also ==
Train passing by the Candidplatz platform

- List of Munich U-Bahn stations
