= Maillingerstraße station =

Station of the Munich U-Bahn

Coordinates: 48°08′54″N 11°32′42″E

Maillingerstraße
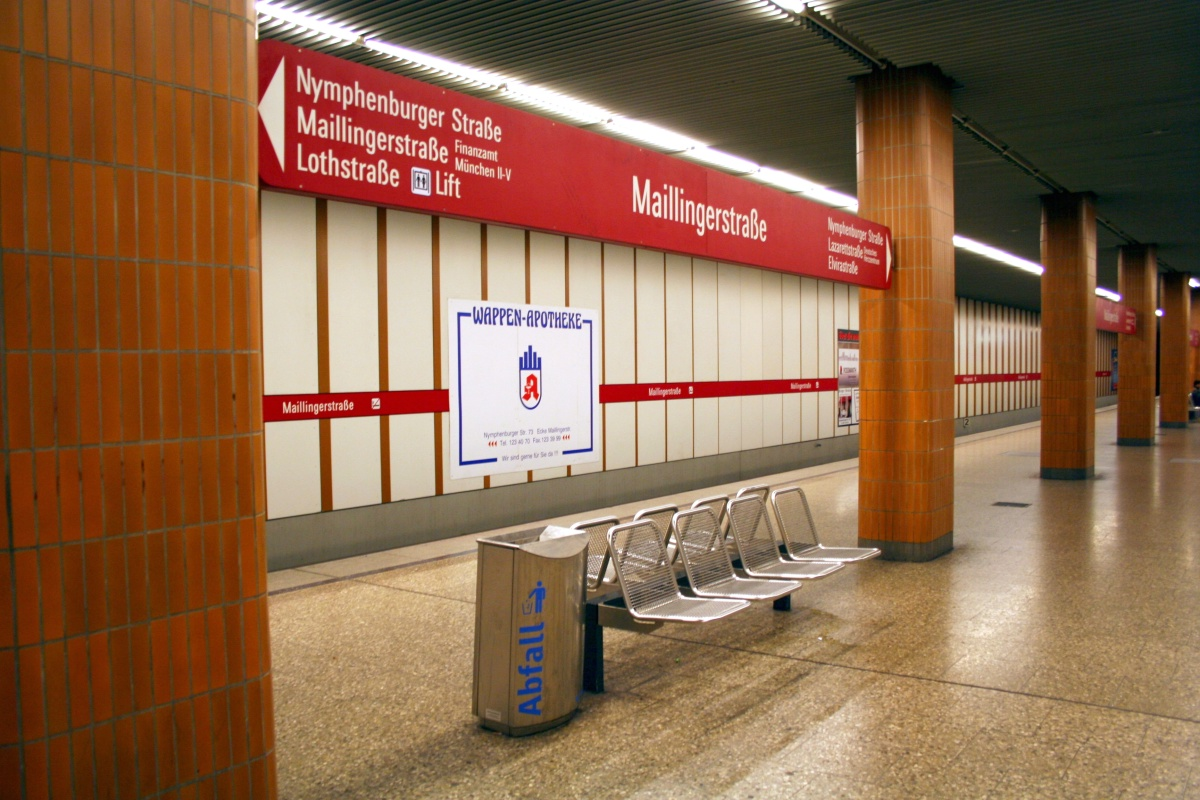

General information
- Location: Germany
- Owner: Münchner Verkehrsgesellschaft
- Operator: Münchner Verkehrsgesellschaft
- Line: Stammstrecke 2
- Connections: Bus

Construction
- Structure type: Underground
- Accessible: Yes

Other information
- Fare zone: : M

History
- Opened: 8 May 1983; 43 years ago

Services
Preceding station	Munich U-Bahn	Following station
Rotkreuzplatz towards Olympia-Einkaufszentrum	U1	Stiglmaierplatz towards Mangfallplatz
Rotkreuzplatz towards Olympia-Einkaufszentrum	U7	Stiglmaierplatz towards Neuperlach Zentrum
Location

Maillingerstraße is an U-Bahn station in Munich on the U1, opened on 28 May 1983.

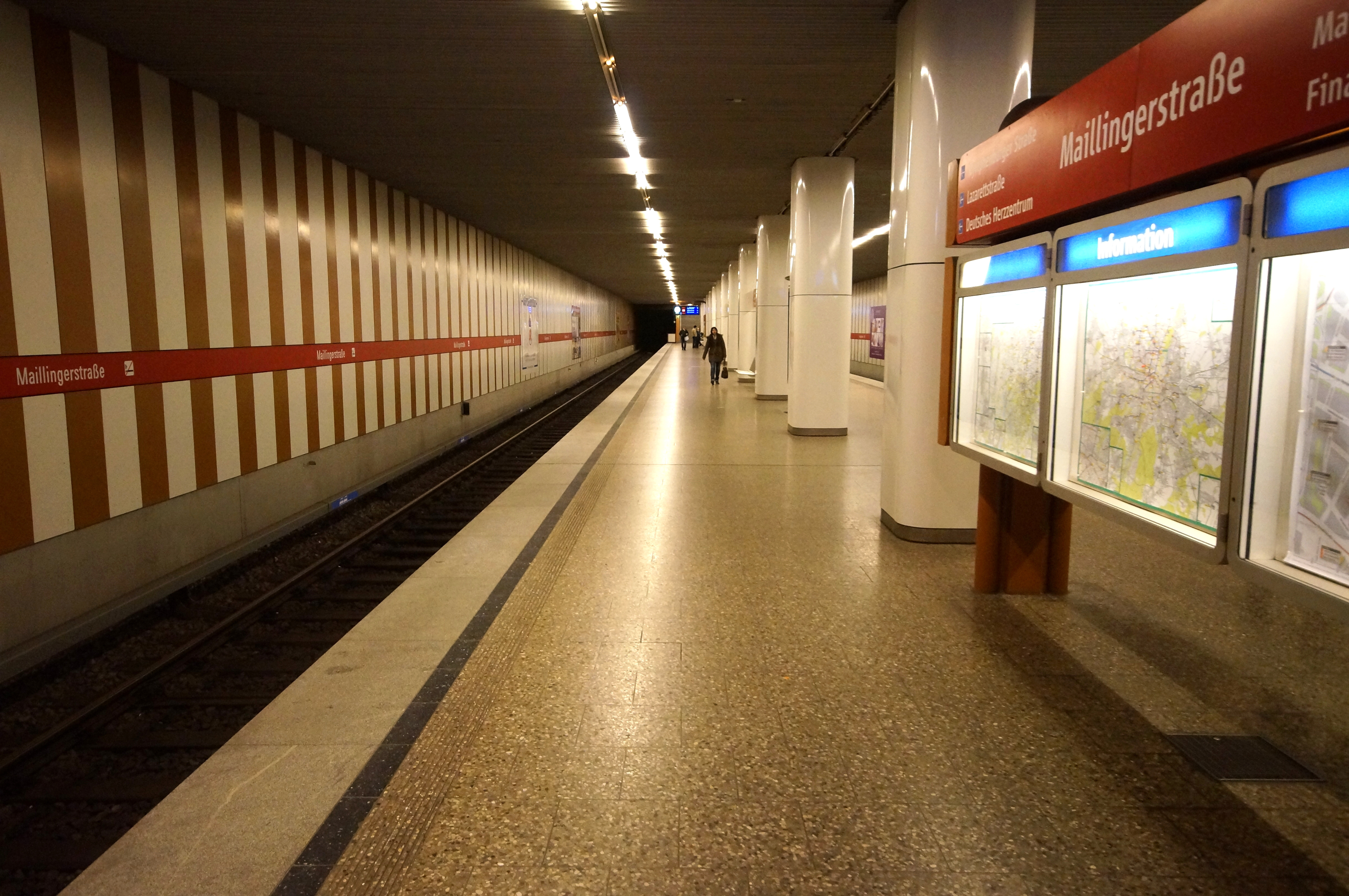
Maillingerstraße station in 2013.

== See also ==
Maillingerstraße
