= Kolumbusplatz station =

Station of the Munich U-Bahn

Kolumbusplatz
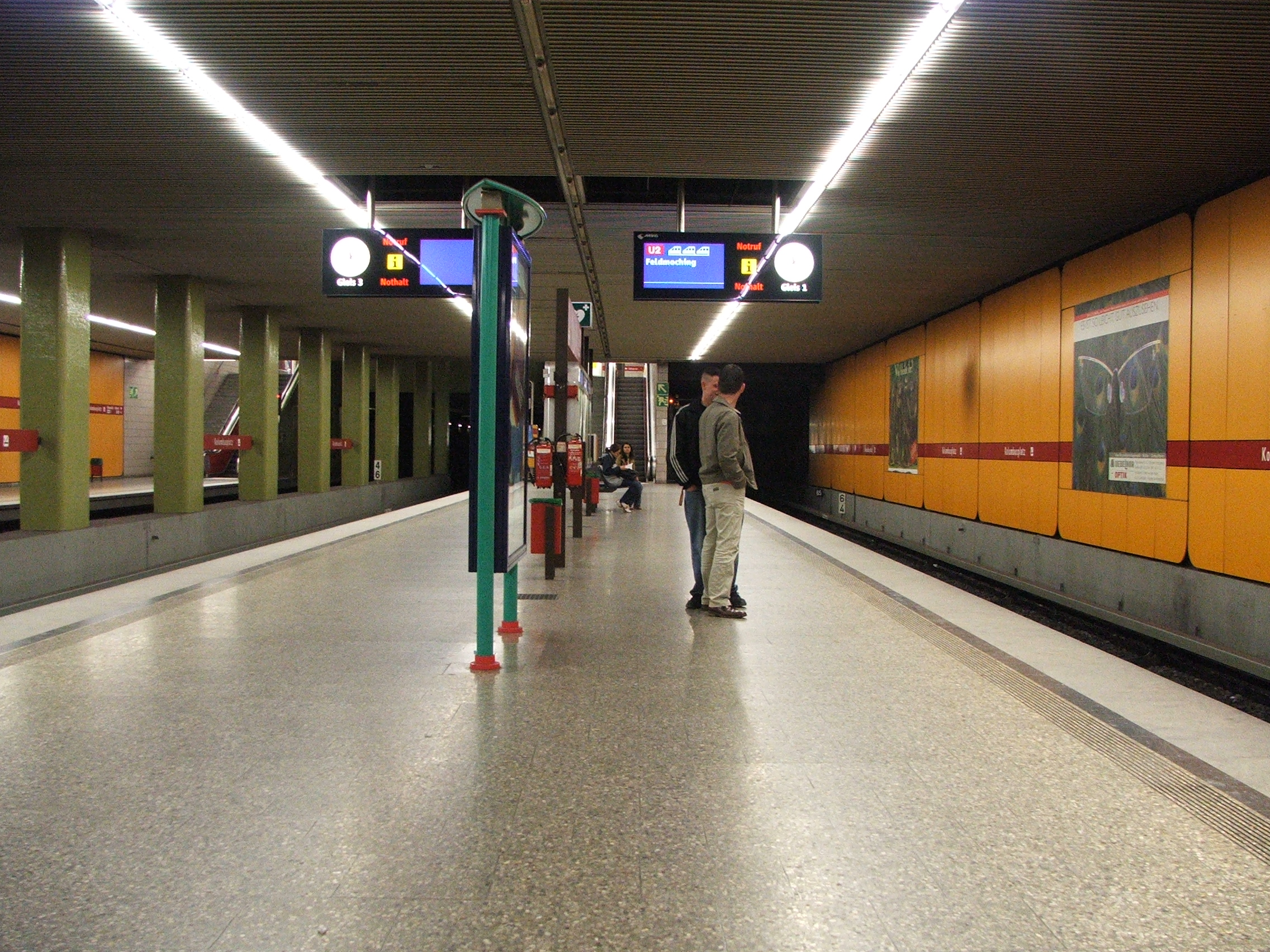
- Kolumbusplatz station platform.

General information
- Location: Au-Haidhausen, Munich; Germany
- Coordinates: 48°07′09″N 11°34′37″E
- Tracks: 3

Construction
- Structure type: Underground
- Accessible: Yes

Other information
- Fare zone: : M

Services
Preceding station	Munich U-Bahn	Following station
Fraunhoferstraße towards Olympia-Einkaufszentrum	U1	Candidplatz towards Mangfallplatz
Fraunhoferstraße towards Feldmoching	U2	Silberhornstraße towards Messestadt Ost
Fraunhoferstraße towards Olympia-Einkaufszentrum	U7	Silberhornstraße towards Neuperlach Zentrum
Fraunhoferstraße towards Olympiazentrum	U8	Silberhornstraße towards Neuperlach Zentrum
Location

Kolumbusplatz is an U-Bahn station in Munich on the U1 and U2 of the Munich U-Bahn system.

== See also ==
- List of Munich U-Bahn stations
