= Fraunhoferstraße station =

Metro station in Munich, Germany

Fraunhoferstraße
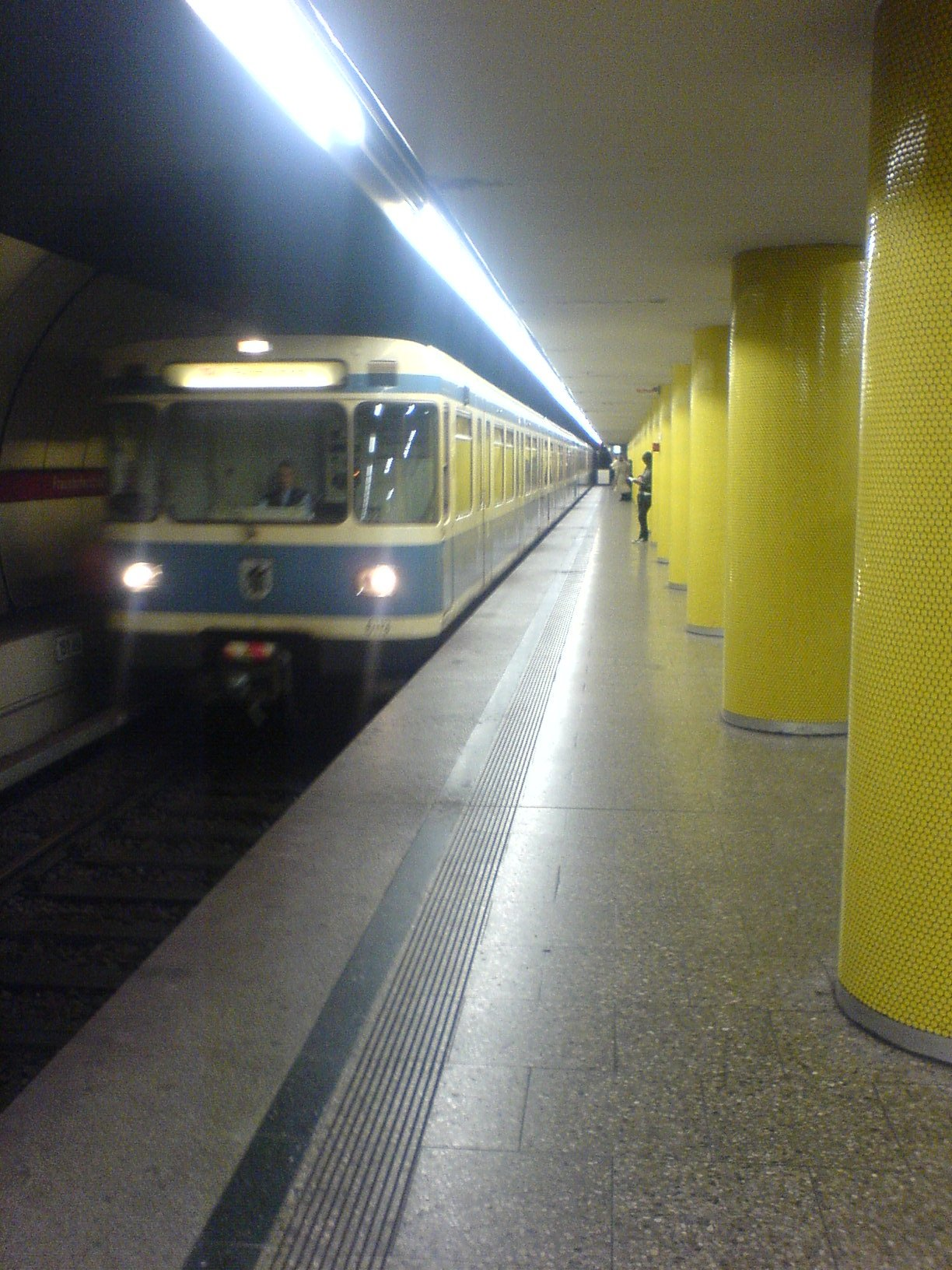
- Platform at Fraunhoferstraße station

General information
- Location: Ludwigsvorstadt-Isarvorstadt, Munich; Germany
- Coordinates: 48°07′45″N 11°34′27″E
- Platforms: Island platform
- Tracks: 2

Construction
- Structure type: Underground
- Accessible: Yes

Other information
- Fare zone: : M

Services
Preceding station	Munich U-Bahn	Following station
Sendlinger Tor towards Olympia-Einkaufszentrum	U1	Kolumbusplatz towards Mangfallplatz
Sendlinger Tor towards Feldmoching	U2	Kolumbusplatz towards Messestadt Ost
Sendlinger Tor towards Olympia-Einkaufszentrum	U7	Kolumbusplatz towards Neuperlach Zentrum
Sendlinger Tor towards Olympiazentrum	U8	Kolumbusplatz towards Neuperlach Zentrum
Location

Fraunhoferstraße is an U-Bahn station in Munich on the U1 and U2. It is also served by route of the Munich tramway.
