= Wettersteinplatz station =

Station of the Munich U-Bahn

Coordinates: 48°06′29″N 11°34′33″E

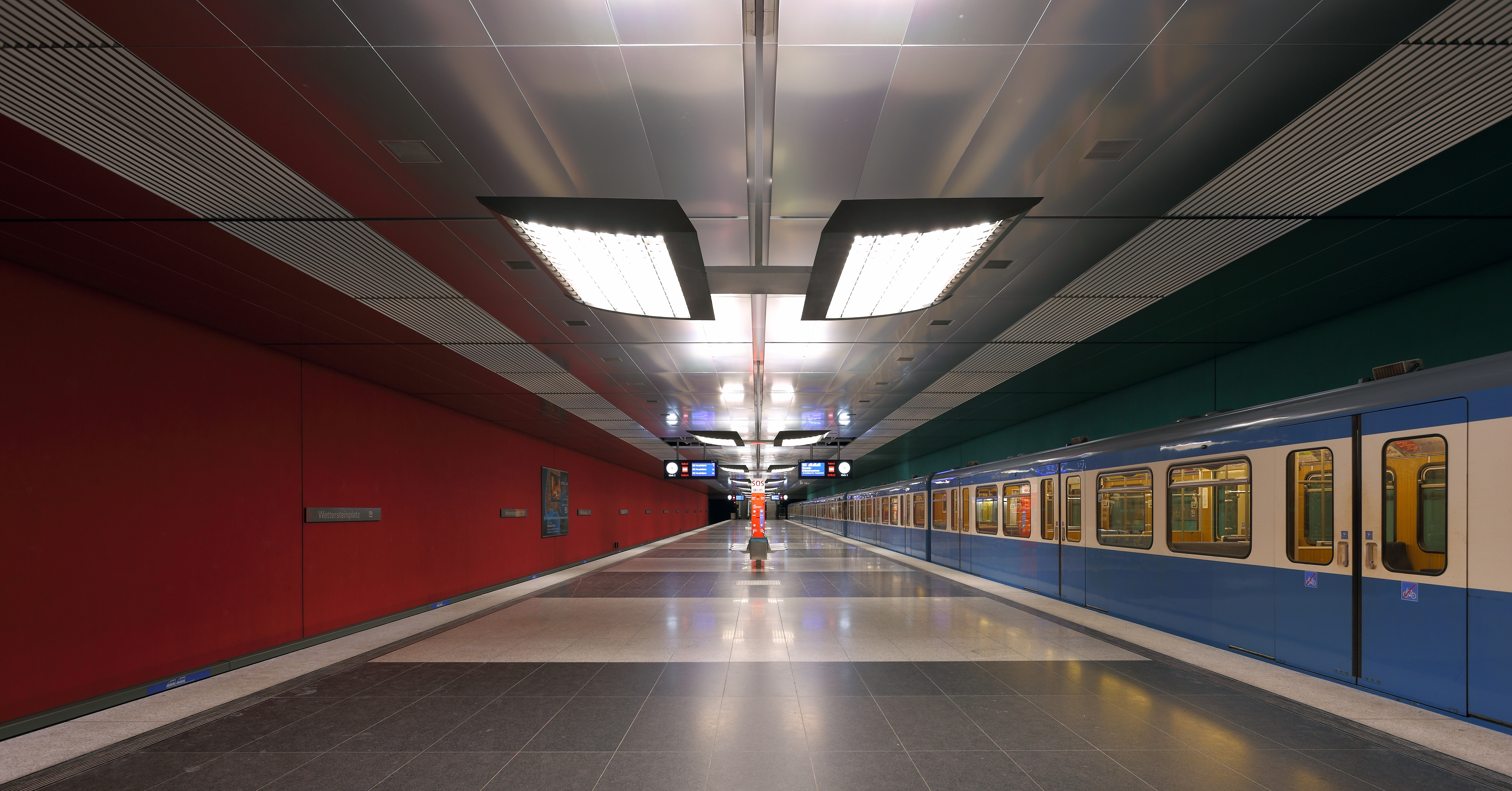
Wettersteinplatz U-Bahn station

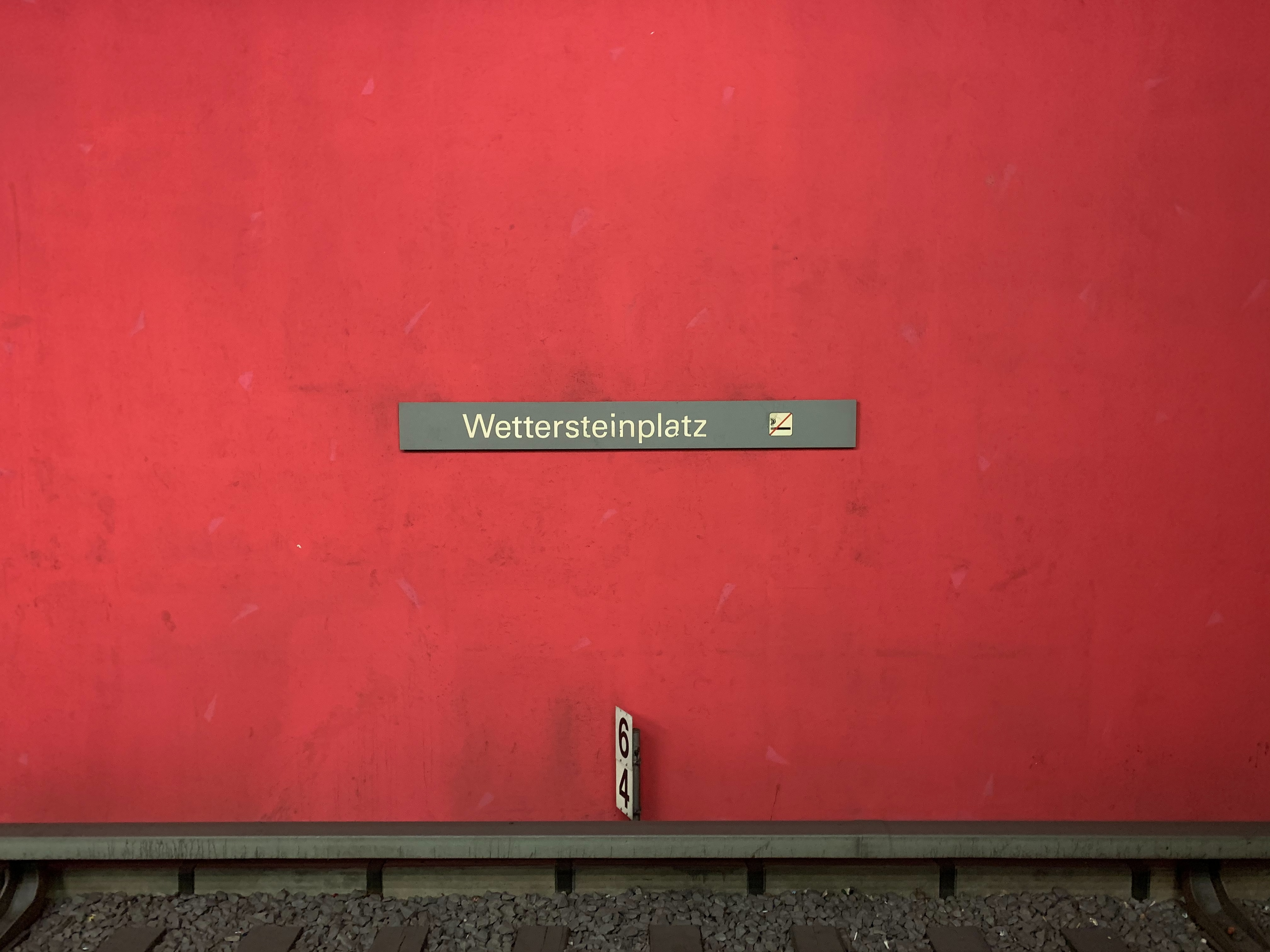

Wettersteinplatz is an U-Bahn station in Munich on the U1. The station is also served by routes and of the Munich tramway.

Preceding station	Munich U-Bahn	Following station
Candidplatz towards Olympia-Einkaufszentrum	U1	St.-Quirin-Platz towards Mangfallplatz
