= Rotkreuzplatz station =

Station of the Munich U-Bahn

Rotkreuzplatz
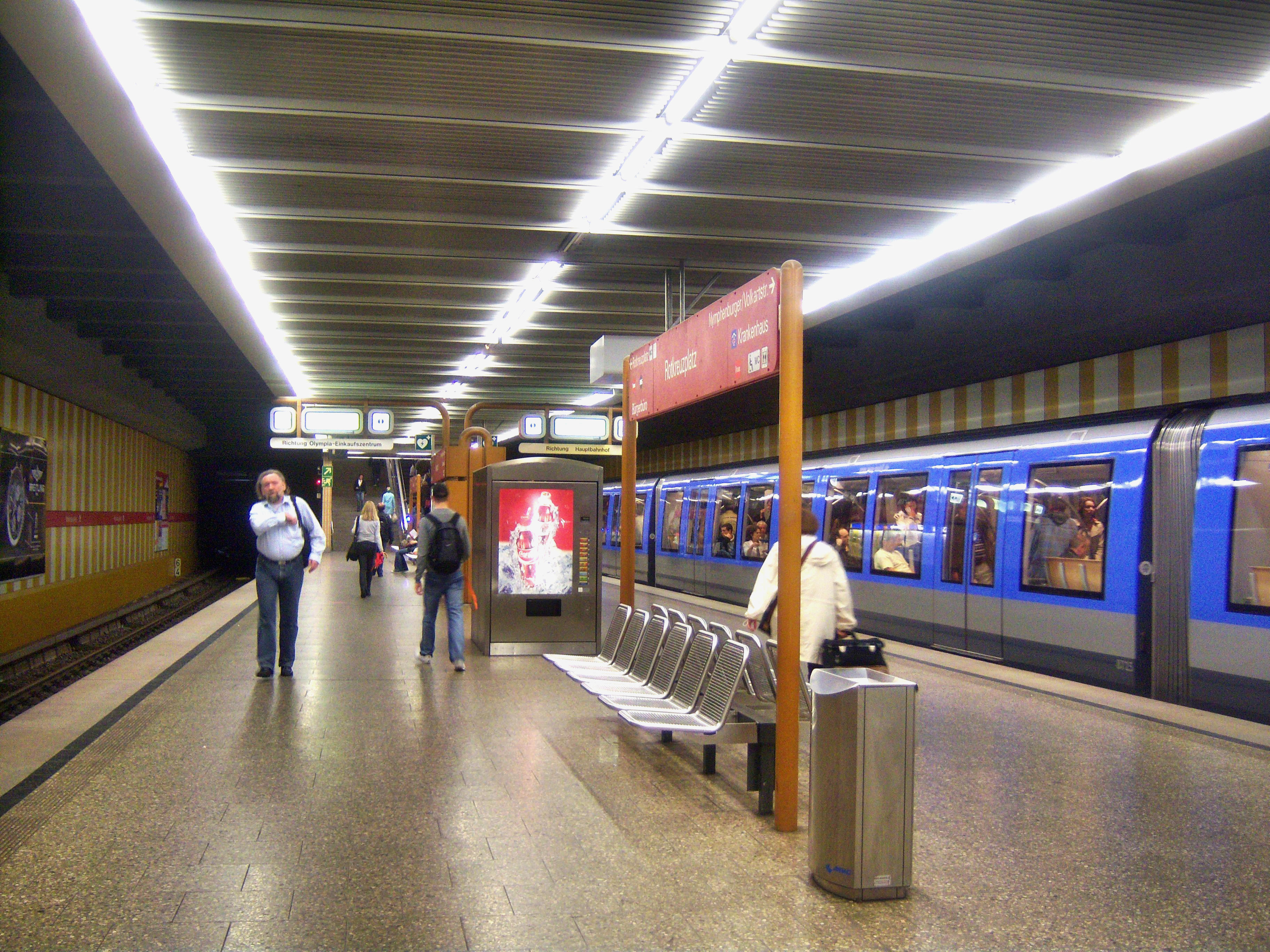

General information
- Location: Neuhausen-Nymphenburg; Munich, Germany
- Coordinates: 48°09′14″N 11°31′59″E
- Platforms: Island platform
- Tracks: 2

Construction
- Structure type: Underground
- Accessible: Yes

Other information
- Fare zone: : M

History
- Opened: 28 May 1983; 43 years ago

Services
Preceding station	Munich U-Bahn	Following station
Gern towards Olympia-Einkaufszentrum	U1	Maillingerstraße towards Mangfallplatz
Gern towards Olympia-Einkaufszentrum	U7	Maillingerstraße towards Neuperlach Zentrum
Location

Rotkreuzplatz is an U-Bahn station in Munich, Germany, on the U1. It was opened on 28 May 1983, the extension onwards to Westfriedhof was not opened until 1998. The station is also served by route of the Munich tramway.
