= Stiglmaierplatz station =

Station of the Munich U-Bahn

Coordinates: 48°08′51″N 11°33′25″E

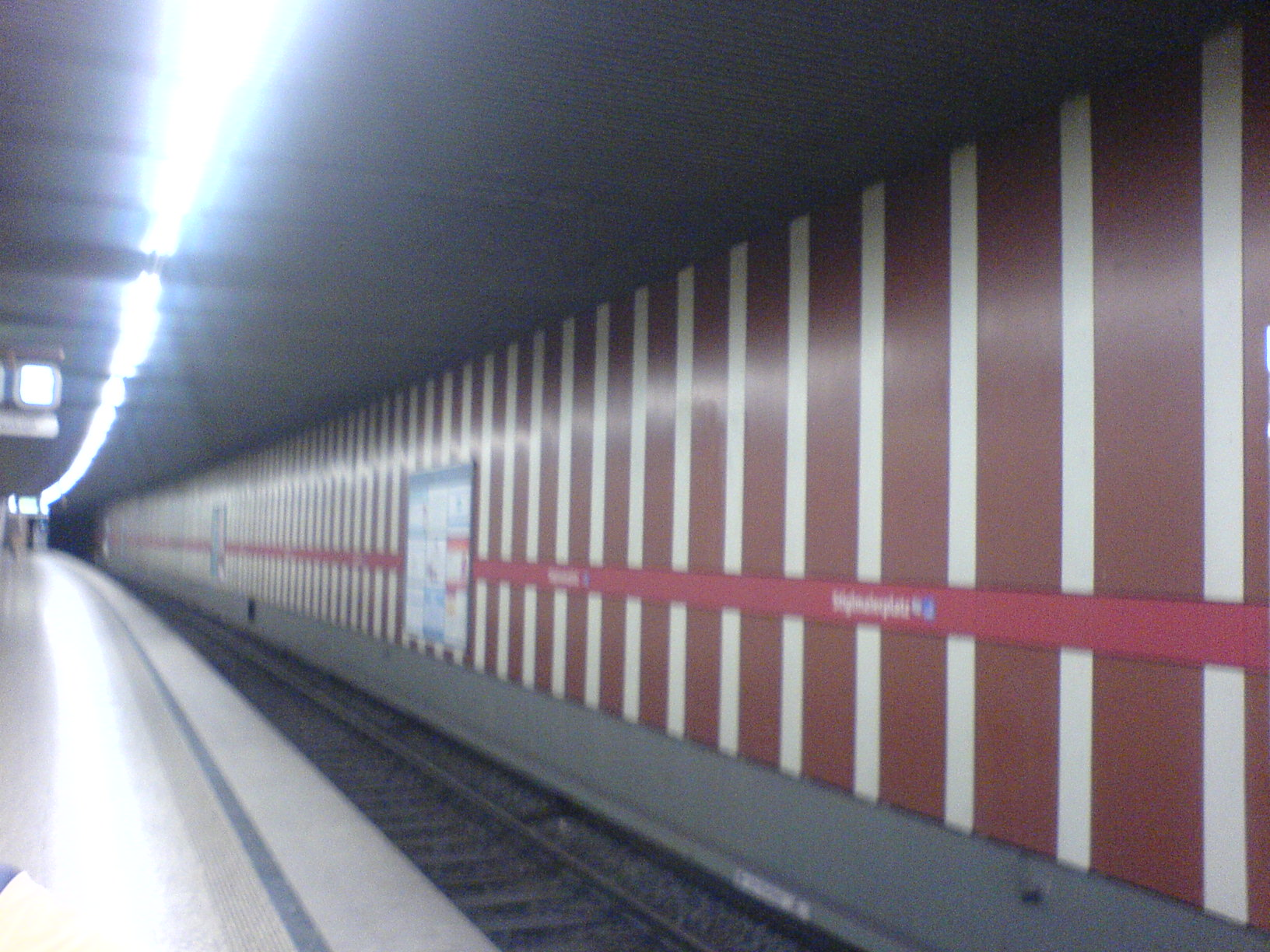
Stiglmaierplatz platform.

Stiglmaierplatz is a square in Maxvorstadt close to Munich city centre and a U-Bahn station on the U1, opened on 28 May 1983 (41 years ago)

Preceding station	Munich U-Bahn	Following station
Maillingerstraße towards Olympia-Einkaufszentrum	U1	Hauptbahnhof towards Mangfallplatz
Maillingerstraße towards Olympia-Einkaufszentrum	U7	Hauptbahnhof towards Neuperlach Zentrum
