= Gern station =

Station of the Munich U-Bahn

Coordinates: 48°09′46″N 11°31′45″E

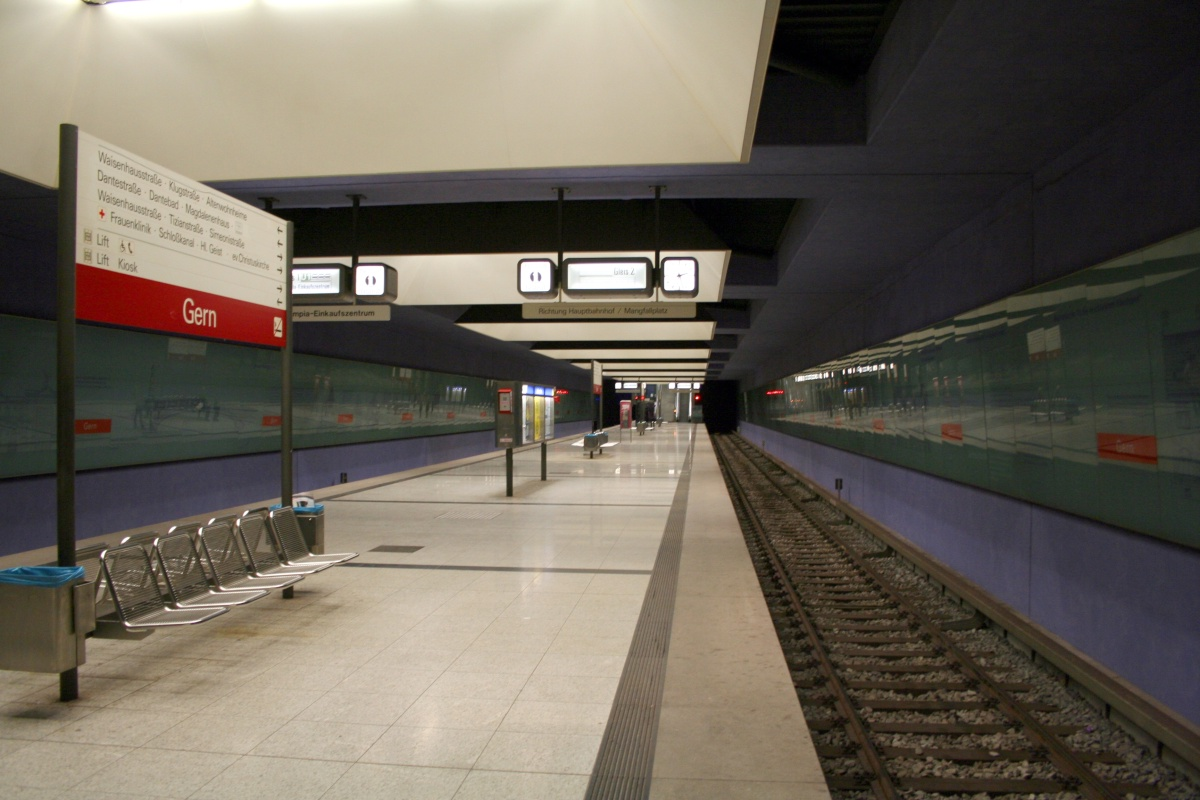
Gern station platform

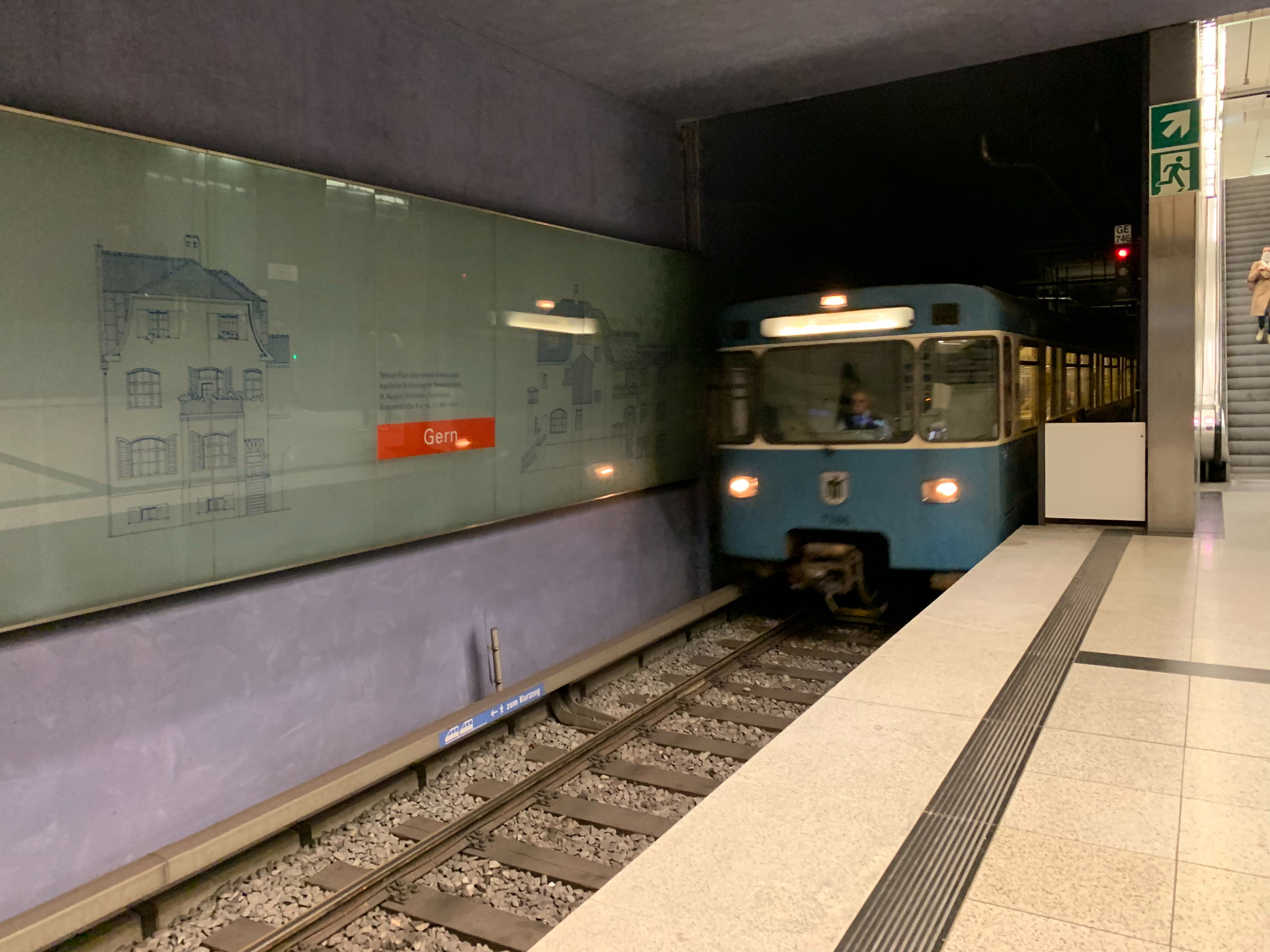
Train approaching the station

Gern is an U-Bahn station in Munich on the U1. It opened on 24 May 1998 (27 years ago). The station includes displays on local history, and is also noted for its innovative lighting; nine pyramidal aluminium fixtures give the illusion of daylight streaming in from above.

Preceding station	Munich U-Bahn	Following station
Westfriedhof towards Olympia-Einkaufszentrum	U1	Rotkreuzplatz towards Mangfallplatz
Westfriedhof towards Olympia-Einkaufszentrum	U7	Rotkreuzplatz towards Neuperlach Zentrum
