= St.-Quirin-Platz station =

Station of the Munich U-Bahn

Coordinates: 48°06′17″N 11°34′52″E

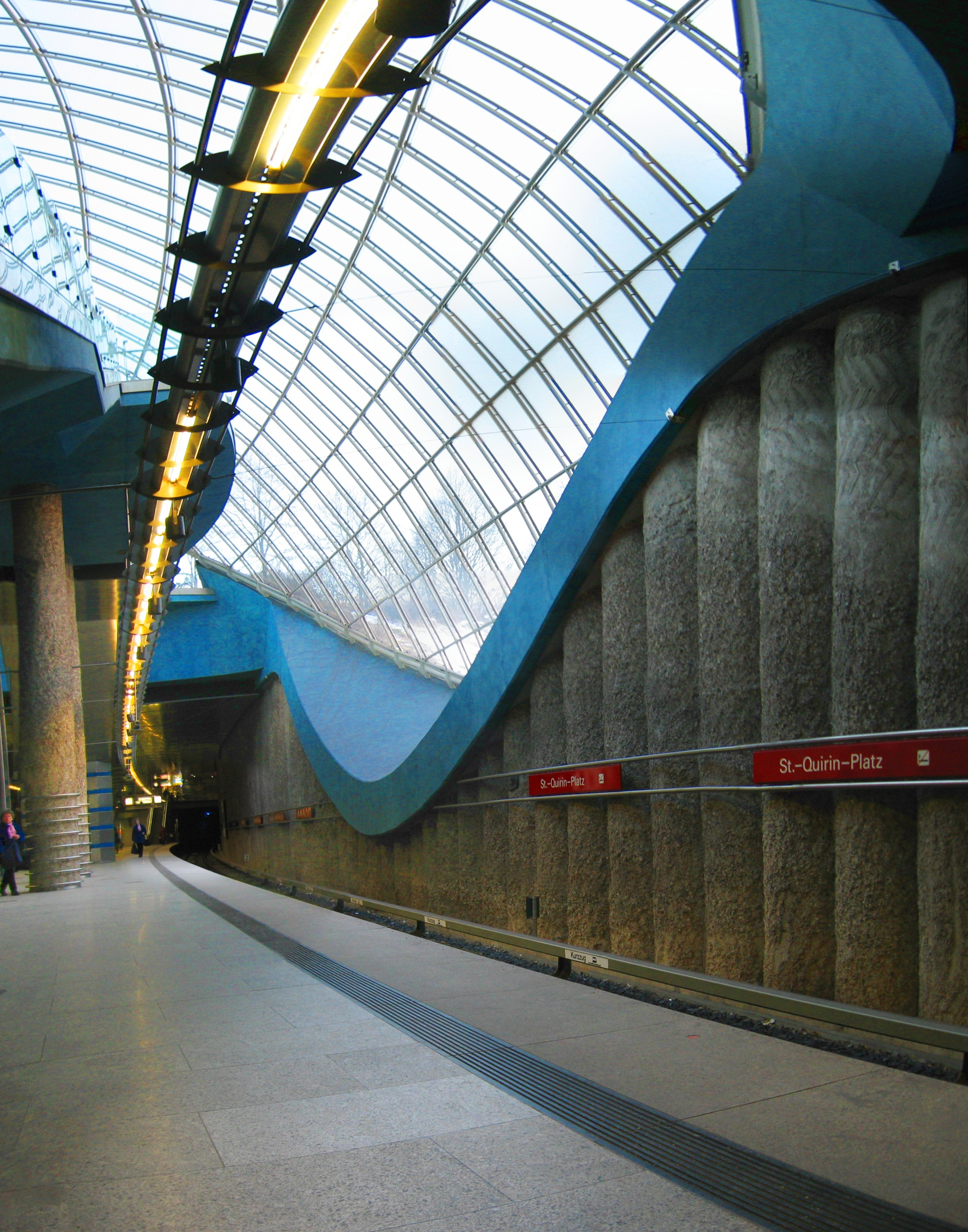
St.-Quirin-Platz station platform.

St.-Quirin-Platz is an U-Bahn station in Munich on the U1 line of the Munich U-Bahn system.

== See also ==
- List of Munich U-Bahn stations

Preceding station	Munich U-Bahn	Following station
Wettersteinplatz towards Olympia-Einkaufszentrum	U1	Mangfallplatz Terminus
