= Georg-Brauchle-Ring station =

Station of the Munich U-Bahn

Georg-Brauchle-Ring

General information
- Location: Moosach; Munich, Germany
- Coordinates: 48°10′35″N 11°31′45″E
- Platforms: Island platform
- Tracks: 2

Construction
- Structure type: Underground
- Accessible: Yes

Other information
- Fare zone: : M

History
- Opened: 18 October 2003; 22 years ago

Services
Preceding station	Munich U-Bahn	Following station
Olympia-Einkaufszentrum Terminus	U1	Westfriedhof towards Mangfallplatz
Olympia-Einkaufszentrum Terminus	U7	Westfriedhof towards Neuperlach Zentrum
Location

Georg-Brauchle-Ring is an U-Bahn station in Munich on the U1. It is located below the Georg-Brauchle-Ring, part of Munich's Mittlerer Ring ring road system. It opened on 18 October 2003. Artist Franz Ackermann produced two coloured walls for the station entitled The Great Journey and consisting of 400 panels, each wall weighing 30 tons.
