= Moosacher St.-Martins-Platz station =

Station of the Munich U-Bahn

Moosacher St.-Martins-Platz

General information
- Location: Moosach; Munich, Germany
- Coordinates: 48°10′55″N 11°31′07″E
- Platforms: Island platform
- Tracks: 2

Construction
- Structure type: Underground
- Accessible: Yes

Other information
- Fare zone: : M

History
- Opened: 11 December 2010

Services
Preceding station	Munich U-Bahn	Following station
Moosach towards Munich-Moosach	U3	Olympia-Einkaufszentrum towards Fürstenried West
Location
- Location within Bavaria Location within Germany Location within Europe

Moosacher St.-Martins-Platz is a railway station on the Munich U-Bahn rapid transit network which opened on 11 December 2010.
