= Mangfallplatz station =

Station of the Munich U-Bahn

Coordinates: 48°05′52″N 11°34′54″E

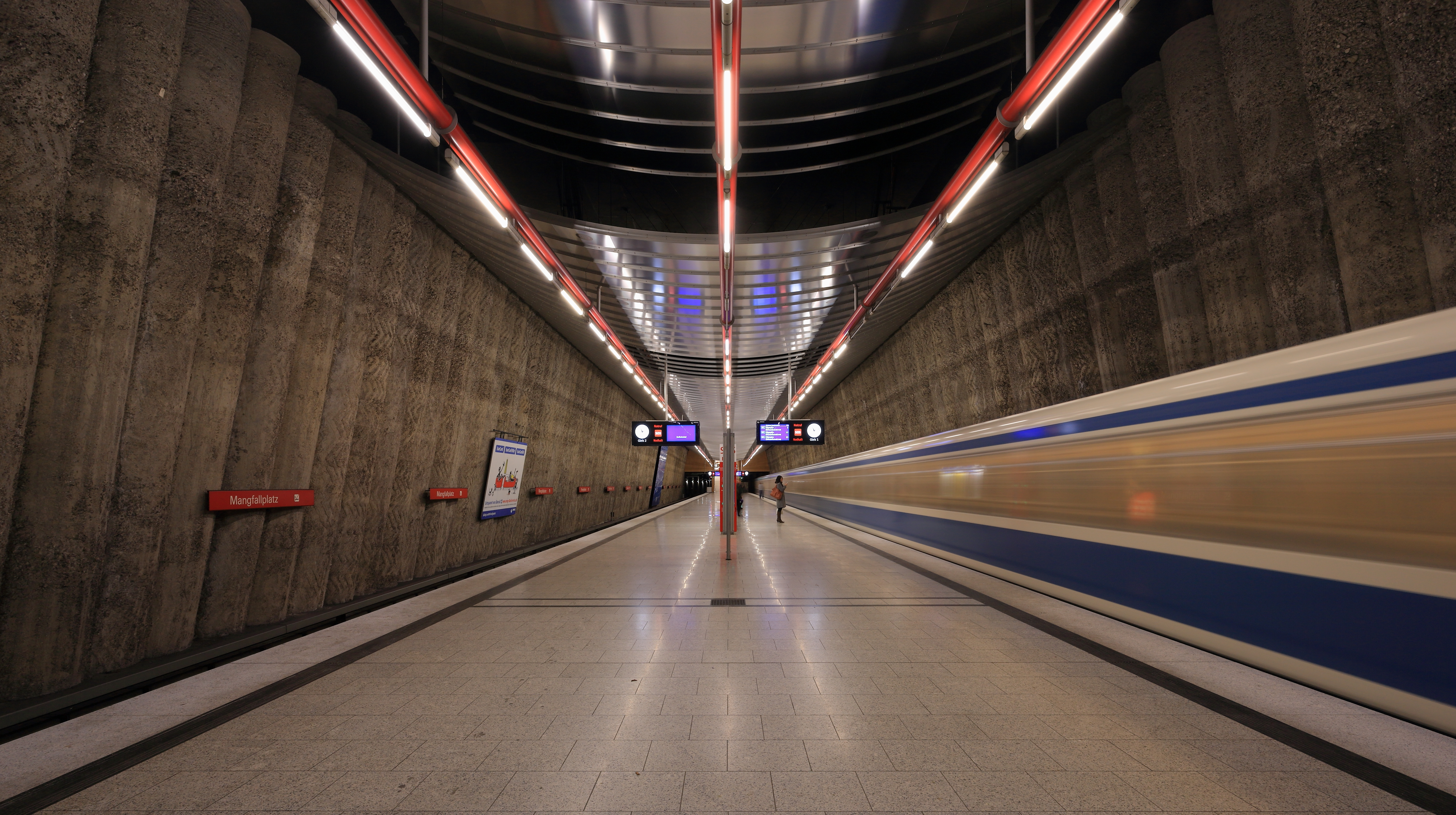
Mangfallplatz station platform.

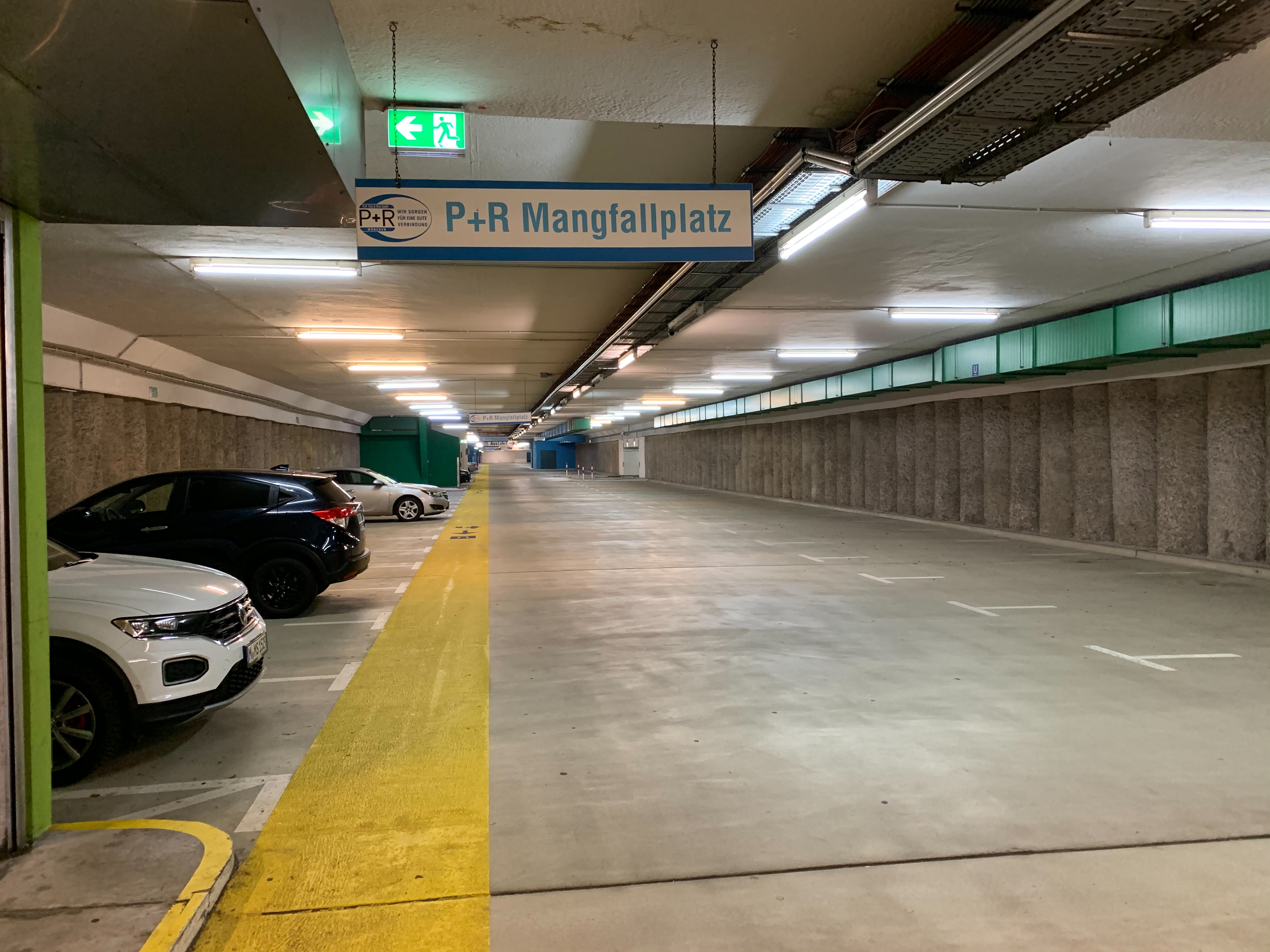
Park&Ride facility located next to the station

Mangfallplatz is an U-Bahn station in Munich on the U1 line of the Munich U-Bahn system. Opened on 9 November 1997 (28 years ago), it is the southernmost station on the line.

South of the metro station is the Perlacher Forest, a popular recreational area of Munich. To the northeast are the former US Army McGraw barracks.

== See also ==
- List of Munich U-Bahn stations

Preceding station	Munich U-Bahn	Following station
St.-Quirin-Platz towards Olympia-Einkaufszentrum	U1	Terminus
