= Olympia-Einkaufszentrum station =

Station of the Munich U-Bahn

Olympia-Einkaufszentrum
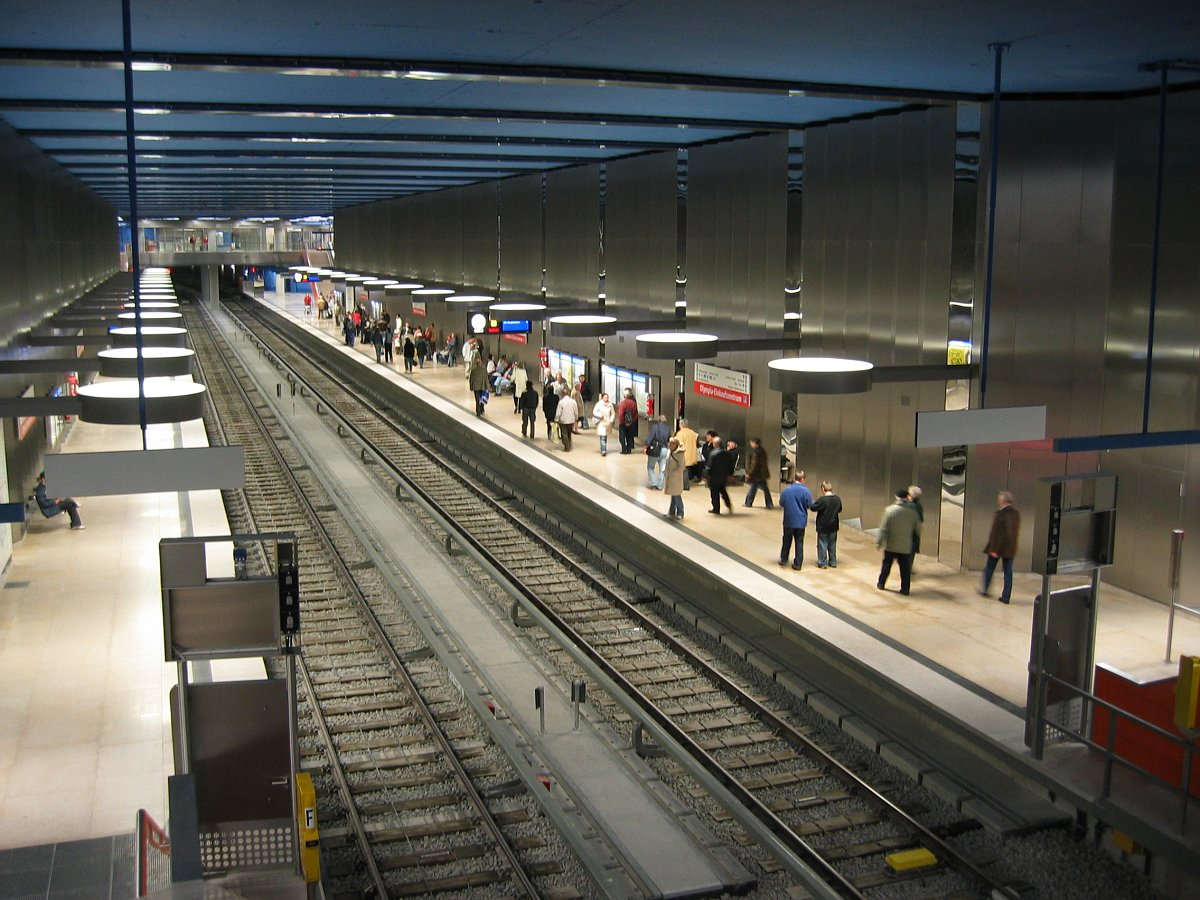

General information
- Location: Moosach; Munich, Germany
- Coordinates: 48°10′55″N 11°31′48″E
- Platforms: Side platforms
- Tracks: 2

Construction
- Structure type: Underground
- Accessible: Yes

Other information
- Fare zone: : M

History
- Opened: 31 October 2004; 21 years ago (upper level); 28 October 2007; 18 years ago (lower level)

Services
Preceding station	Munich U-Bahn	Following station
Terminus	U1	Georg-Brauchle-Ring towards Mangfallplatz
Terminus	U7	Georg-Brauchle-Ring towards Neuperlach Zentrum
Moosacher St.-Martins-Platz towards Munich-Moosach	U3	Oberwiesenfeld towards Fürstenried West
Location
- Location within Bavaria Location within Germany Location within Europe

Olympia-Einkaufszentrum is a U-Bahn station in Munich, serving the Olympia-Einkaufszentrum (OEZ), a shopping mall in the Olympiapark area of Moosach. It is the terminus of the U1 line of the Munich U-Bahn system. The U3 extension to Olympia-Einkaufszentrum opened on 28 October 2007.

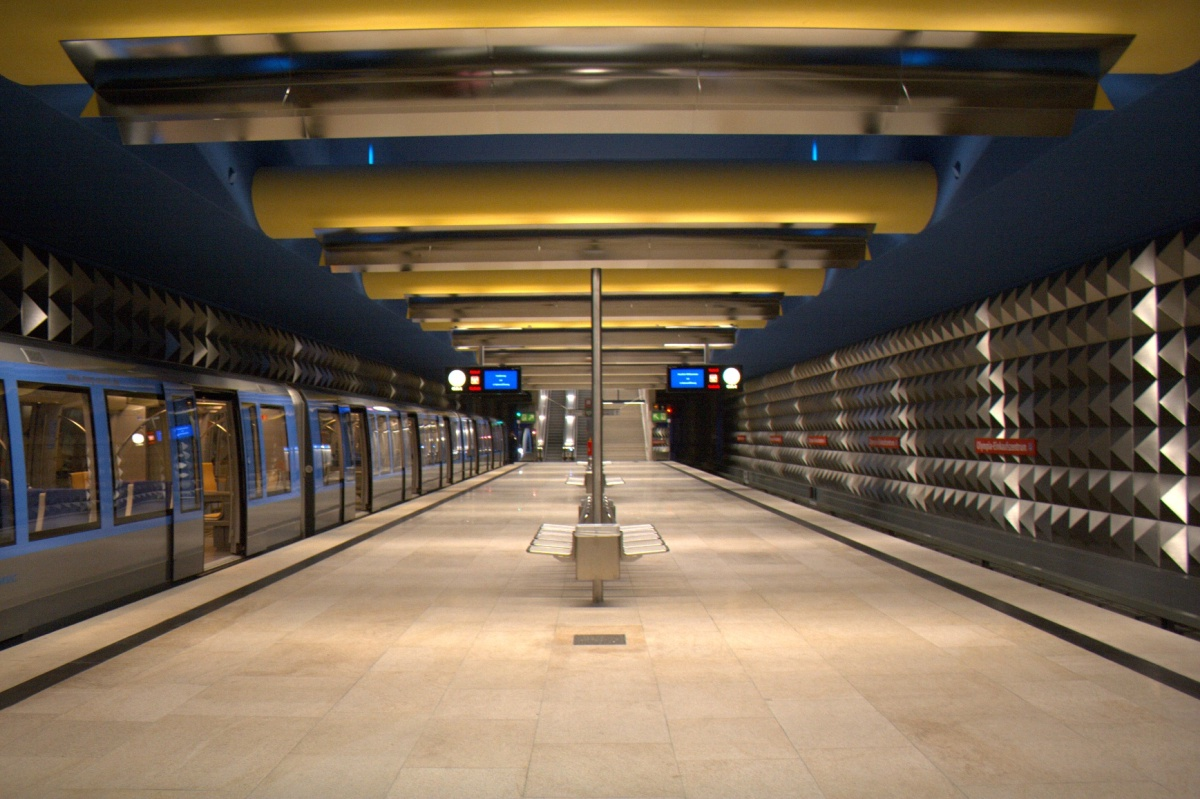
U3 platform (lower level).

== See also ==
- List of Munich U-Bahn stations
