= Karl-Preis-Platz station =

Station of the Munich U-Bahn

Coordinates: 48°07′05″N 11°36′31″E

Karl-Preis-Platz
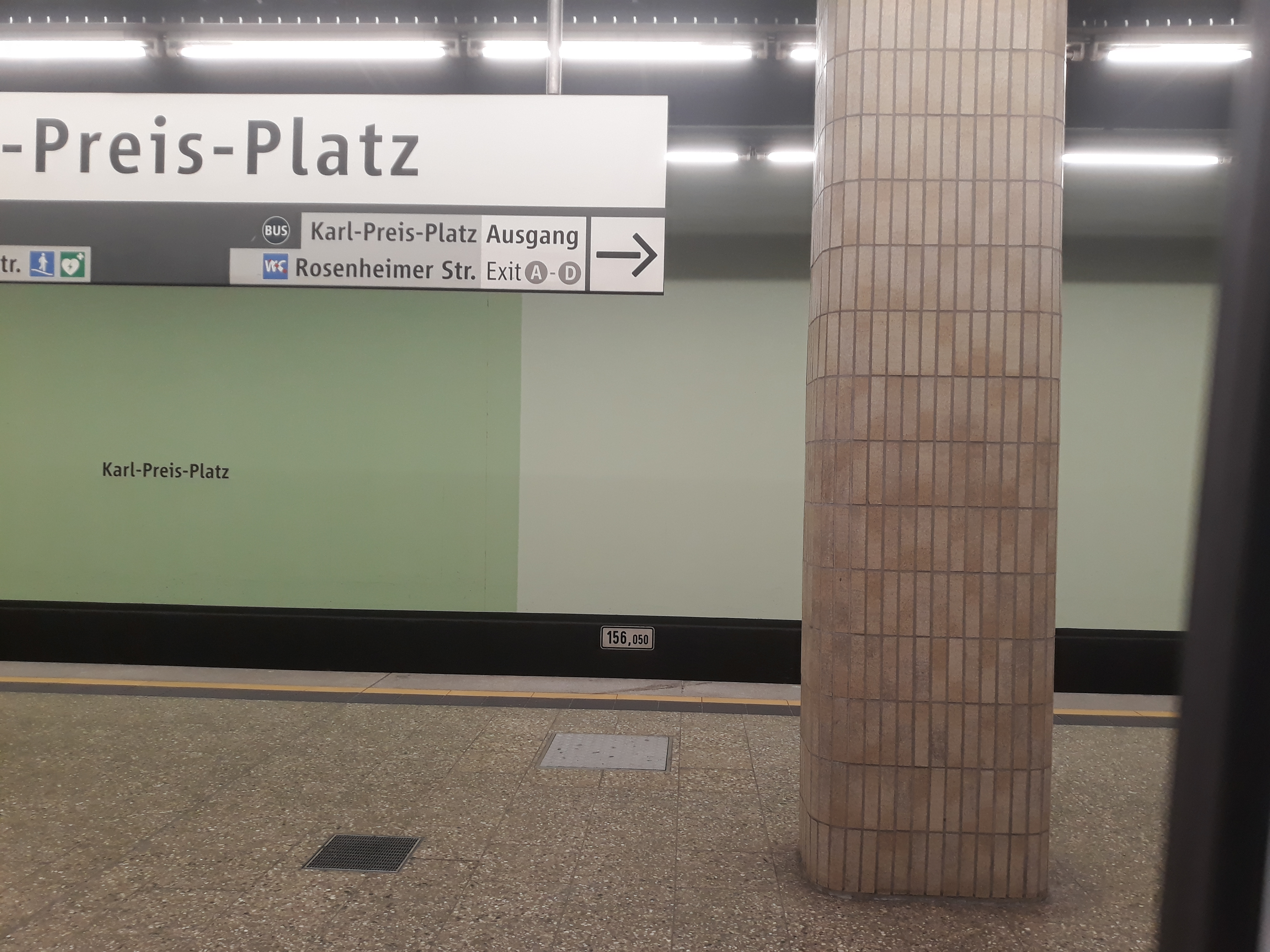
- Karl-Preis-Platz

General information
- Location: Ramersdorf, Munich, Bavaria; Germany
- Line: 55, 59, 145, 155
- Platforms: 2
- Tracks: 2

Construction
- Structure type: Underground
- Accessible: Yes

Other information
- Station code: n/a
- Category: Subway station
- Fare zone: : M

History
- Opened: 18 October 1980

Services
Preceding station	Munich U-Bahn	Following station
Giesing towards Feldmoching	U2	Innsbrucker Ring towards Messestadt Ost
Giesing towards Olympia-Einkaufszentrum	U7	Innsbrucker Ring towards Neuperlach Zentrum
Giesing towards Olympiazentrum	U8	Innsbrucker Ring towards Neuperlach Zentrum
Location

Karl-Preis-Platz is a Munich U-Bahn station on line U2. Since 12. December 2011 it is also used by the booster line U7 in the morning.

The station is situated below Claudius-Keller-Straße in the borough of Ramersdorf. The walls are covered by grey-beige-colored panels, the floor is paved with artificial gravels that resemble gravels from the river Isar. The pillars are covered by grey-beige-colored tiles. The ceiling has rows of neon tubes and is faced with aluminium lamellae. At the western end you can get to the surface using a ramp. At the eastern end you use stairs to get to a mezzanine. From there you can reach the junction Claudius-Keller-Straße/Rosenheimer Straße.

The station was named after the Karl-Preis-Platz which was named after Karl Sebastian Preis (SPD), town councilor in Munich and founder of the local building society GEWOFAG.

== Stations ==
Line	Stations
U2	Feldmoching – Hasenbergl – Dülferstraße – Harthof – Am Hart – Frankfurter Ring – Milbertshofen – Scheidplatz – Hohenzollernplatz – Josephsplatz – Theresienstraße – Königsplatz – Hauptbahnhof – Sendlinger Tor – Fraunhoferstraße – Kolumbusplatz – Silberhornstraße – Untersbergstraße – Giesing – Karl-Preis-Platz – Innsbrucker Ring – Josephsburg – Kreillerstraße – Trudering – Moosfeld – Messestadt West – Messestadt Ost
U7	Olympia-Einkaufszentrum – Georg-Brauchle-Ring – Westfriedhof – Gern – Rotkreuzplatz – Maillingerstraße – Stiglmaierplatz – Hauptbahnhof – Sendlinger Tor – Fraunhoferstraße – Kolumbusplatz – Silberhornstraße – Untersbergstraße – Giesing – Karl-Preis-Platz – Innsbrucker Ring – Michaelibad – Quiddestraße – Neuperlach Zentrum
