= Munich-Trudering station =

Station of the Munich S-Bahn and U-Bahn

München Trudering
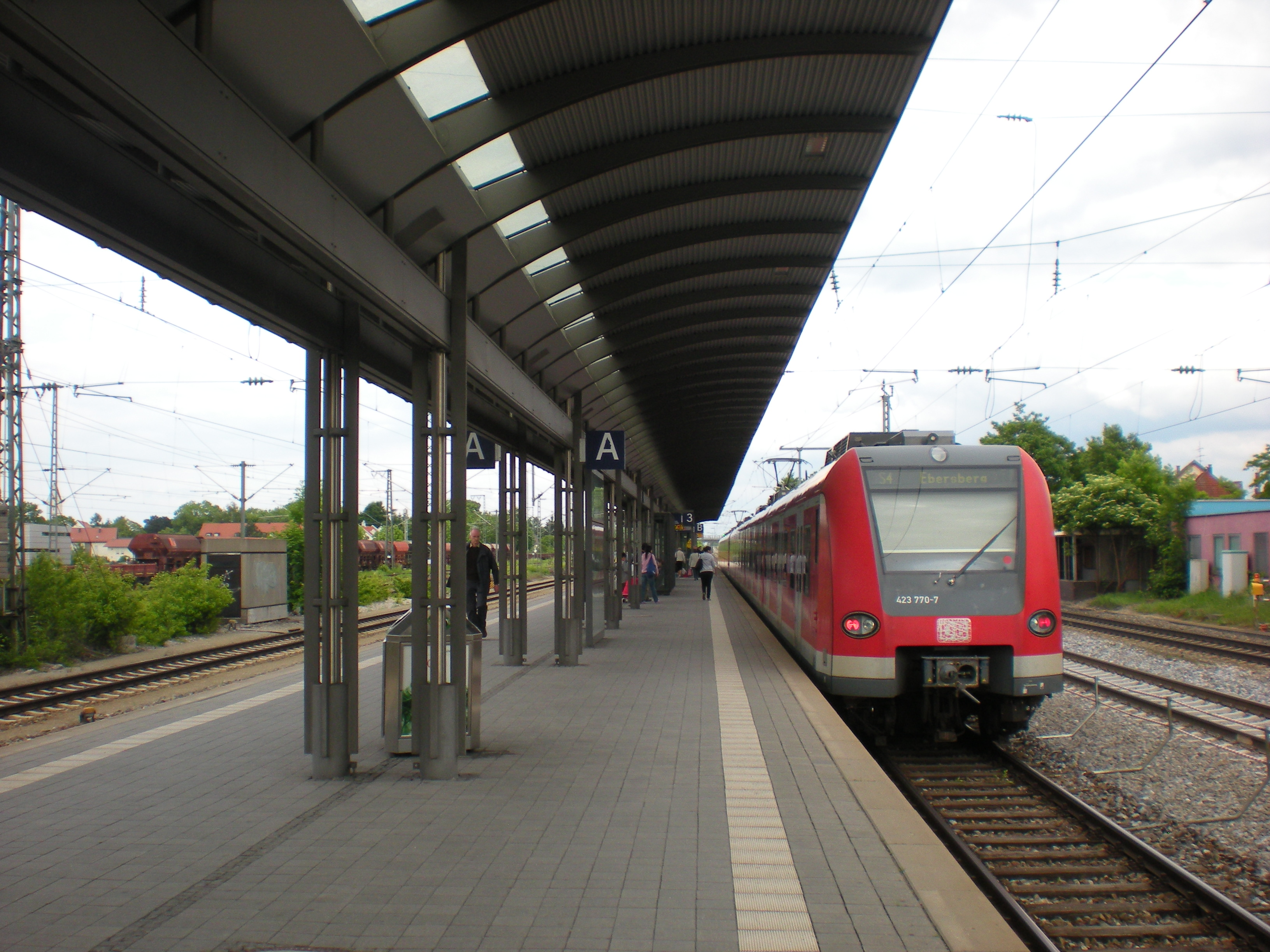
- Trudering S-Bahn station

General information
- Location: Truderinger Str. 261; Trudering-Riem, Munich, Bavaria; Germany
- Coordinates: 48°7′34″N 11°39′47″E
- Owner: DB Netz
- Operator: DB Station&Service
- Lines: Munich–Rosenheim (KBS 950/951/999.4); Munich North Ring
- Platforms: 2 S-Bahn, 2 U-Bahn
- Train operators: S-Bahn München
- Connections: 139, 185, 192, 193, 194, E185, N79

Construction
- Accessible: Yes

Other information
- Station code: 4270
- DS100 code: MTR
- IBNR: 8004162
- Category: 5
- Fare zone: : M and 1
- Website: stationsdatenbank.de; www.bahnhof.de

History
- Opened: 15 October 1871; 154 years ago

Services
Preceding station	Munich S-Bahn	Following station
Berg am Laim towards Geltendorf	S4	Gronsdorf towards Ebersberg
Berg am Laim towards Tutzing	S6	Gronsdorf towards Ebersberg
Preceding station	Munich U-Bahn	Following station
Kreillerstraße towards Feldmoching	U2	Moosfeld towards Messestadt Ost
Location
- Location within Bavaria Location within Germany Location within Europe

Munich-Trudering station is an interchange station of the Munich S-Bahn and the Munich U-Bahn in the borough of Trudering-Riem in the Bavarian capital of Munich.

== History ==
Trudering station was opened on 15 October 1871 at the same time as the Munich–Rosenheim railway. On 1 October 1938, Trudering station was renamed as Bahnhof München-Trudering (Munich–Trudering station). The former station building was demolished in the 1970s. On 28 May 1972 it has been integrated into the network of the Munich S-Bahn. Since 1979, the S-Bahn has had its own tracks through Trudering.

The U-Bahn station was opened on line U 2 under Truderinger Straße on 29 May 1999. During the construction of the tunnel on 20 September 1994, a cavity opened up below the road due to water penetration and a bus crashed in the resulting crater, leading to the death of two passengers and a construction worker. This delayed the completion of the tunnel to Riem and the station until 1999.

== Structure ==
=== Surface station ===
Trudering station has ten tracks, two of which have a platform. Tracks 1 and 2 have no platforms and are used for long-distance and regional services on the Munich–Rosenheim railway.

Tracks 3 and 4 are located on a 238 m-long (781 ft) and 96 cm-high (38 in) central platform and is served by the S-Bahn. Track 3 is used by S-Bahn services towards Zorneding and track 4 is used by S-Bahn services towards Munich. There are two entrances, both connecting to a passenger tunnel. In addition, a lift connects the platform with the eastern tunnel.

Tracks 5 and 6 are part of the Munich North Ring, which runs from Daglfing station in the west to meet the Munich–Rosenheim railway. They are therefore mainly used by freight trains. About 1.2 kilometres east of the station the main freight tracks cross under the S-Bahn and connect with the mainline tracks at a flying junction. Tracks 7–10 are used as sidings for freight trains and suburban railcars. To the west of the station, the three lines are interconnected at sets of points.

=== U-Bahn station ===
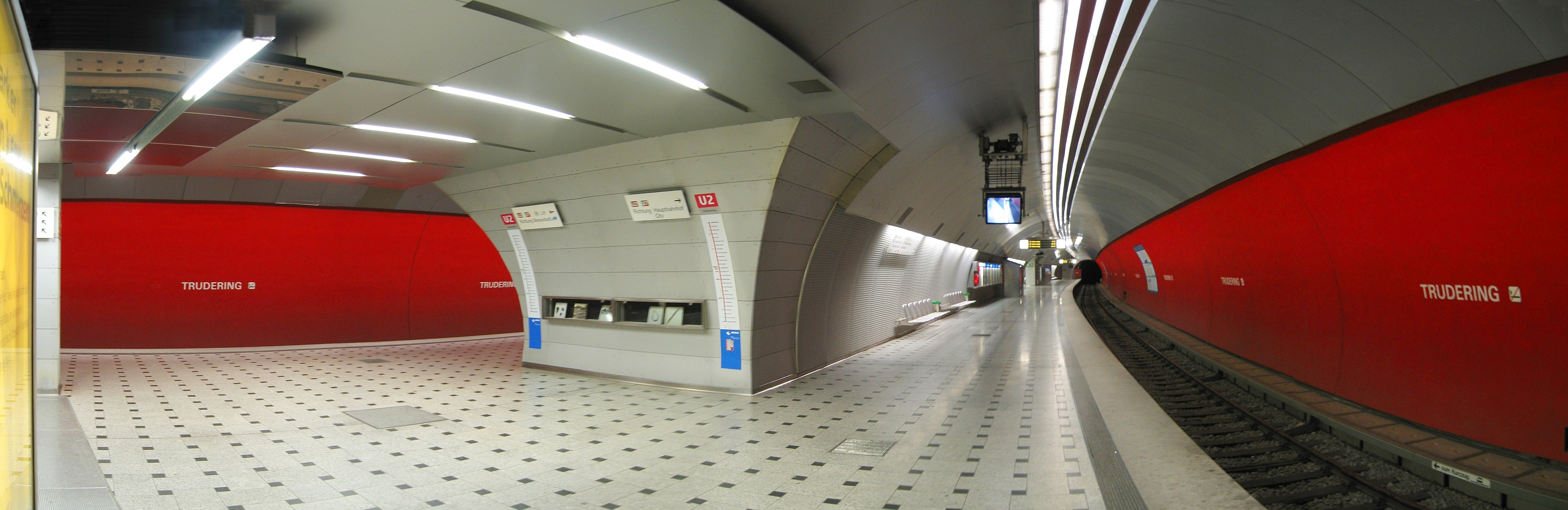
Trudering U-Bahn station

Trudering U-Bahn station is under Truderinger Straße and is located on the second trunk line of the Munich U-Bahn network. It is operated as the eastern branch of the U2 line.

The station was built using the shield tunnelling method so that the central platform is divided between two platforms in tubes. These are joined together by two cross passages. Since the station is on a curve, the platforms are staggered. The side walls are painted in bright red, the standard colour for line U2. At this station the name is written in white. The other design elements are decorated in shades of grey. The inner walls of the platforms and parts of the ceiling are clad with aluminum. The floor was designed with light and dark gray granite. At a depth of 24 metres, Trudering U-Bahn station is one of the deepest U-Bahn stations in Munich.

=== Connecting tunnel ===
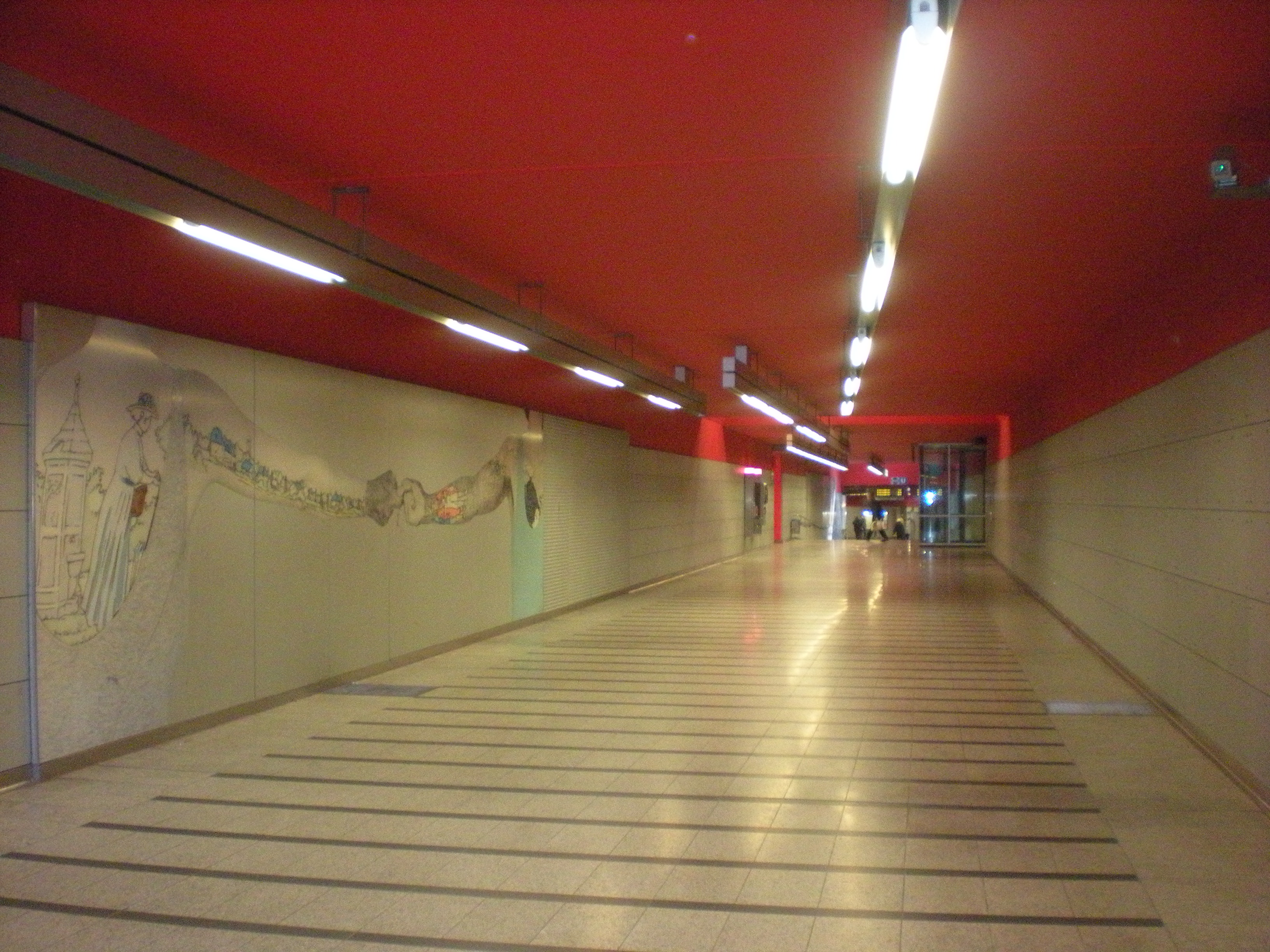
Eastern connecting tunnel

In the eastern tunnel there is a representation of Fingerhakel (a Germanic sport similar to thumb wrestling) and arm wrestling. It connects the eastern mezzanine level of the U-Bahn station with the basement level of the S-Bahn station. In addition, there is an exit to the bus station and to Truderinger Straße to the south of the station and an exit to Birthälmer Straße to the north. A lift connects the S-Bahn platform with this connecting tunnel and another lift connects the U-Bahn platform with the eastern entrance to the bus station. There is also a third lift on the north side to connect the tunnel to the surface.

The western tunnel also connects the S-Bahn platform to the U-Bahn station and Truderinger Straße. However, it does not connect to the northern side of the station and has no lifts.

There are parking areas on Truderinger Straße and Birthälmer Straße.

== Services ==
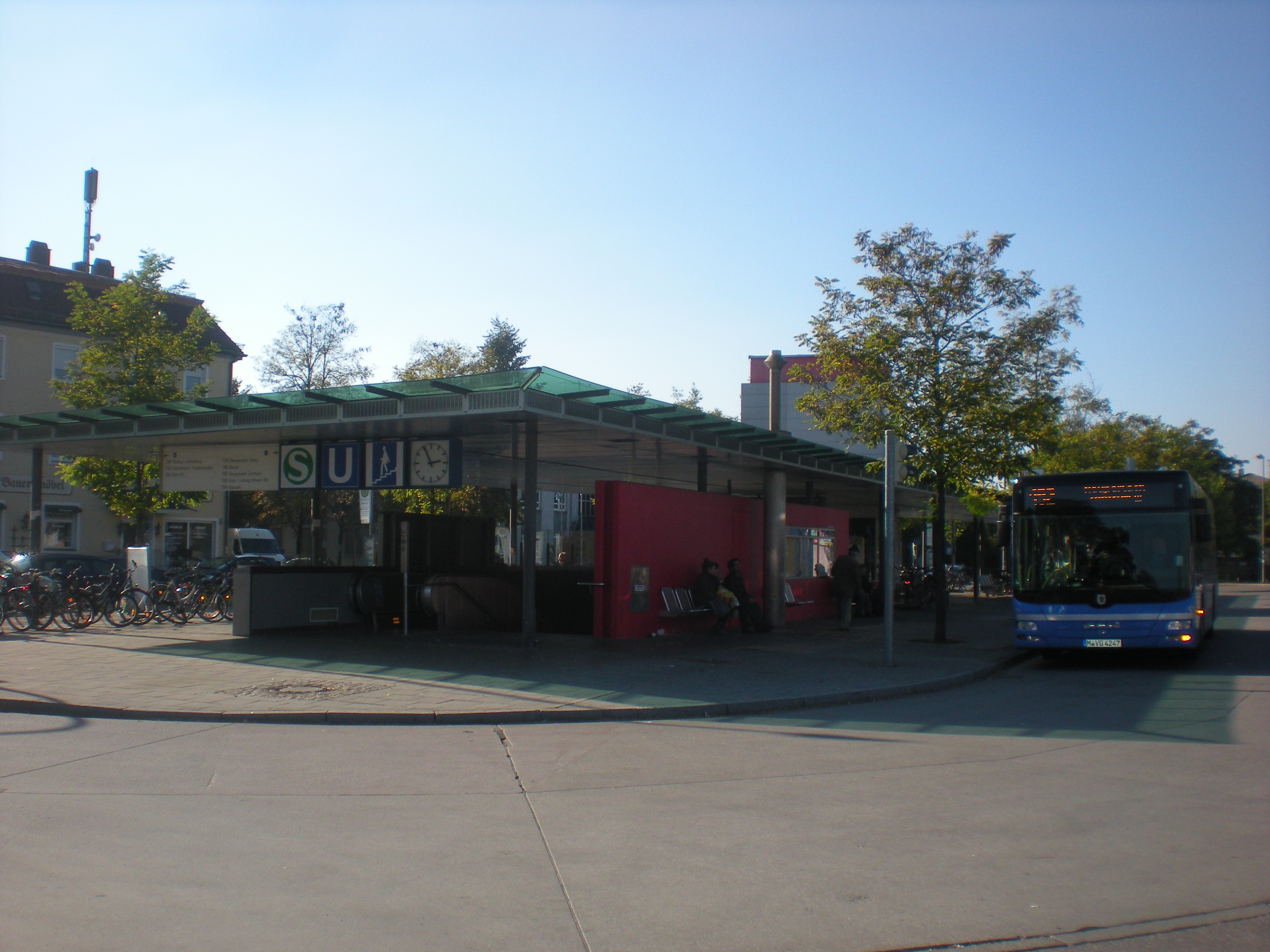
Trudering Bahnhof bus station with route 192 bus

Trudering S-Bahn station is served by line S 4 running between Geltendorf and Ebersberg. In the peak hour it is also served by line S 6 between Tutzing and Zorneding, producing a 10-minute interval service to central Munich. Every day about 150 S-Bahn trains stop at Trudering. Regional and long-distance trains pass through the station without stopping.

Trudering U-Bahn station is on the eastern branch of line U 2, which shares part of its route with line U 1. The line crosses local residential areas from Feldmoching and so connects with the northern districts of Munich. At Scheidplatz the line connects with line U 3, connecting to Olympiapark. There is also the connection to Munich Central Station (Hauptbahnhof) and Sendlinger Tor, where connections can be made to the other U-Bahn lines. The route of the U 2 to Riem serves Riem Park, which was landscaped for the 2005 Bundesgartenschau (Federal Horticultural Show) and the New Munich Exhibition Ground (Neue Messe München).

The bus station at Trudering station, which is on Truderinger Straße above the U-Bahn station, is served by buses on Munich bus routes 139, 146, 192, 193 and 194, and night bus N49.

The U-bahn line and bus routes are operated by Münchner Verkehrsgesellschaft (Munich Transport Company). Fares are set by Münchner Verkehrs- und Tarifverbund (Munich Transport and Tariff Association).

== Stations ==
Line	Stations
U2	Feldmoching – Hasenbergl – Dülferstraße – Harthof – Am Hart – Frankfurter Ring – Milbertshofen – Scheidplatz – Hohenzollernplatz – Josephsplatz – Theresienstraße – Königsplatz – Hauptbahnhof – Sendlinger Tor – Fraunhoferstraße – Kolumbusplatz – Silberhornstraße – Untersbergstraße – Giesing – Karl-Preis-Platz – Innsbrucker Ring – Josephsburg – Kreillerstraße – Trudering – Moosfeld – Messestadt West – Messestadt Ost
