= Moosfeld station =

Station of the Munich U-Bahn

Coordinates: 48.130638°N 11.670909°E

Moosfeld
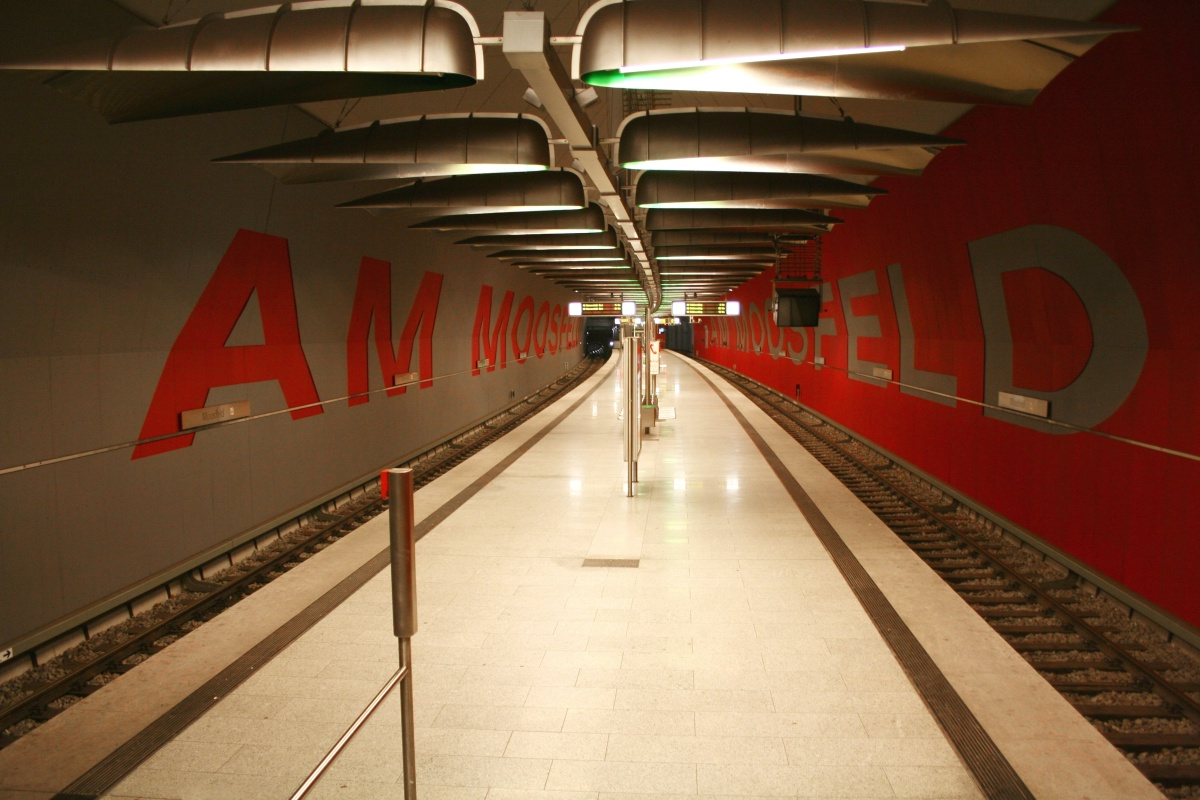
- Moosfeld

General information
- Location: Trudering-Riem, Munich, Bavaria; Germany
- Platforms: 2
- Tracks: 2

Construction
- Structure type: Underground
- Accessible: Yes

Other information
- Station code: n/a
- Category: Subway station
- Fare zone: : M and 1

History
- Opened: 29 May 1999

Services
Preceding station	Munich U-Bahn	Following station
Trudering towards Feldmoching	U2	Messestadt West towards Messestadt Ost
Location
- Location within Bavaria Location within Germany Location within Europe

Moosfeld is a Munich U-Bahn station on line U2.

== Overview ==
The station was opened on 29 May 1999 and is situated in Trudering-Riem.

It was named after a piece of swamp nearby. Since the station is situated beneath the narrow Salzmesserstraße, the 700 pillars for the walls had to be drilled oblique into the earth during the construction of the station. The lower part of the walls are straight, thus leading to a horizontal kink. The walls and the ceiling are made of concrete that is painted red on one side and grey on the other side. On the red side in grey letters the name of the borough is written down ("Am Moosfeld") while the colors are inverted on the other side. The floor is covered by granite slabs. The platform is illuminated by lamps installed in metal that are shaped like a spoon.

In the ceiling there is a pipe that contains the Truderinger Hüllgraben.

Besides the suburban area, there is the industrial area Am Moosfeld that leads to a better frequentation of the station. At the northern end there are stairs and an escalator leading to a mezzanine. In the mezzanine there is a kiosk. From there you get to the ground level. At the southern end there are stairs and an elevator leading to ground level.

== Stations ==
Line	Stations
U2	Feldmoching – Hasenbergl – Dülferstraße – Harthof – Am Hart – Frankfurter Ring – Milbertshofen – Scheidplatz – Hohenzollernplatz – Josephsplatz – Theresienstraße – Königsplatz – Hauptbahnhof – Sendlinger Tor – Fraunhoferstraße – Kolumbusplatz – Silberhornstraße – Untersbergstraße – Giesing – Karl-Preis-Platz – Innsbrucker Ring – Josephsburg – Kreillerstraße – Trudering – Moosfeld – Messestadt West – Messestadt Ost
