= Messestadt West station =

Station of the Munich U-Bahn

Coordinates: 48°08′00″N 11°41′28″E

Messestadt West
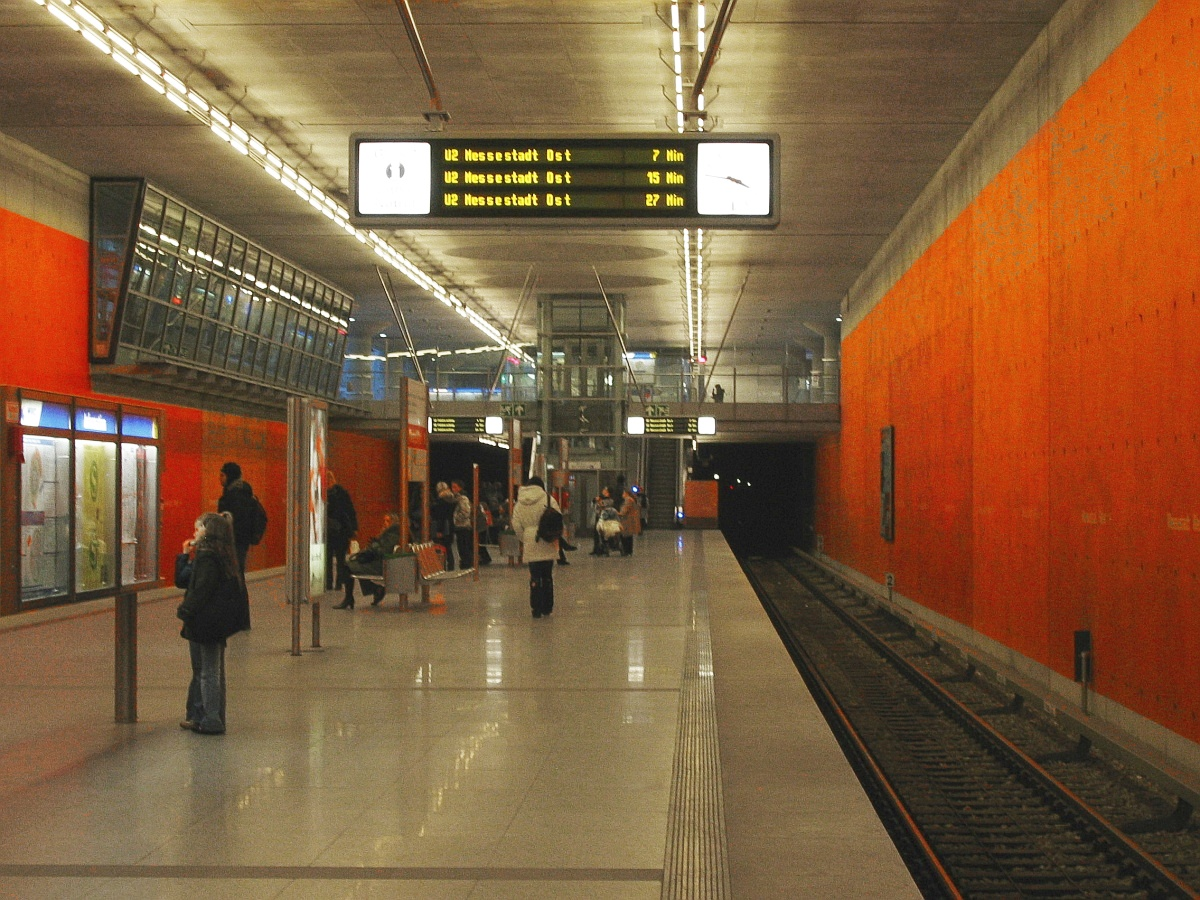
- Messestadt West

General information
- Other names: Riem West, Neu-Riem West
- Location: Trudering-Riem, Munich, Bavaria; Germany
- Line: 139, 183, 190, 263, 264
- Platforms: 2
- Tracks: 2

Construction
- Structure type: Underground
- Accessible: Yes

Other information
- Station code: n/a
- Category: Subway station
- Fare zone: : M and 1

History
- Opened: 29 May 1999

Services
Preceding station	Munich U-Bahn	Following station
Moosfeld towards Feldmoching	U2	Messestadt Ost Terminus
Location
- Location within Bavaria Location within Germany Location within Europe

Messestadt-West is a Munich U-Bahn station on line U2.

== Overview ==
The station was opened on 29 May 1999 and is situated in the Messestadt Riem of which he covers the western part. It is situated below the Willy-Brandt-Allee. There are 9 light domes in the middle of the road. The walls and the ceiling are made of light red colored concrete. The station is illuminated by 2 rows of neon tubes, the light domes and by the mezzanine. The floor is covered by granite slabs and thus reflects the light. At the northern mezzanine there is the Messesee. The western entrance of the Messe München is accessible from here. At the southern end of the station there is also a mezzanine. From here you can get to the Willy-Brandt-Allee. The codenames of the station were Riem West and Neu-Riem West.

== Stations ==
Line	Stations
U2	Feldmoching – Hasenbergl – Dülferstraße – Harthof – Am Hart – Frankfurter Ring – Milbertshofen – Scheidplatz – Hohenzollernplatz – Josephsplatz – Theresienstraße – Königsplatz – Hauptbahnhof – Sendlinger Tor – Fraunhoferstraße – Kolumbusplatz – Silberhornstraße – Untersbergstraße – Giesing – Karl-Preis-Platz – Innsbrucker Ring – Josephsburg – Kreillerstraße – Trudering – Moosfeld – Messestadt West – Messestadt Ost
