= Kreillerstraße station =

Station of the Munich U-Bahn

Coordinates: 48°07′33″N 11°38′49″E

Kreillerstraße
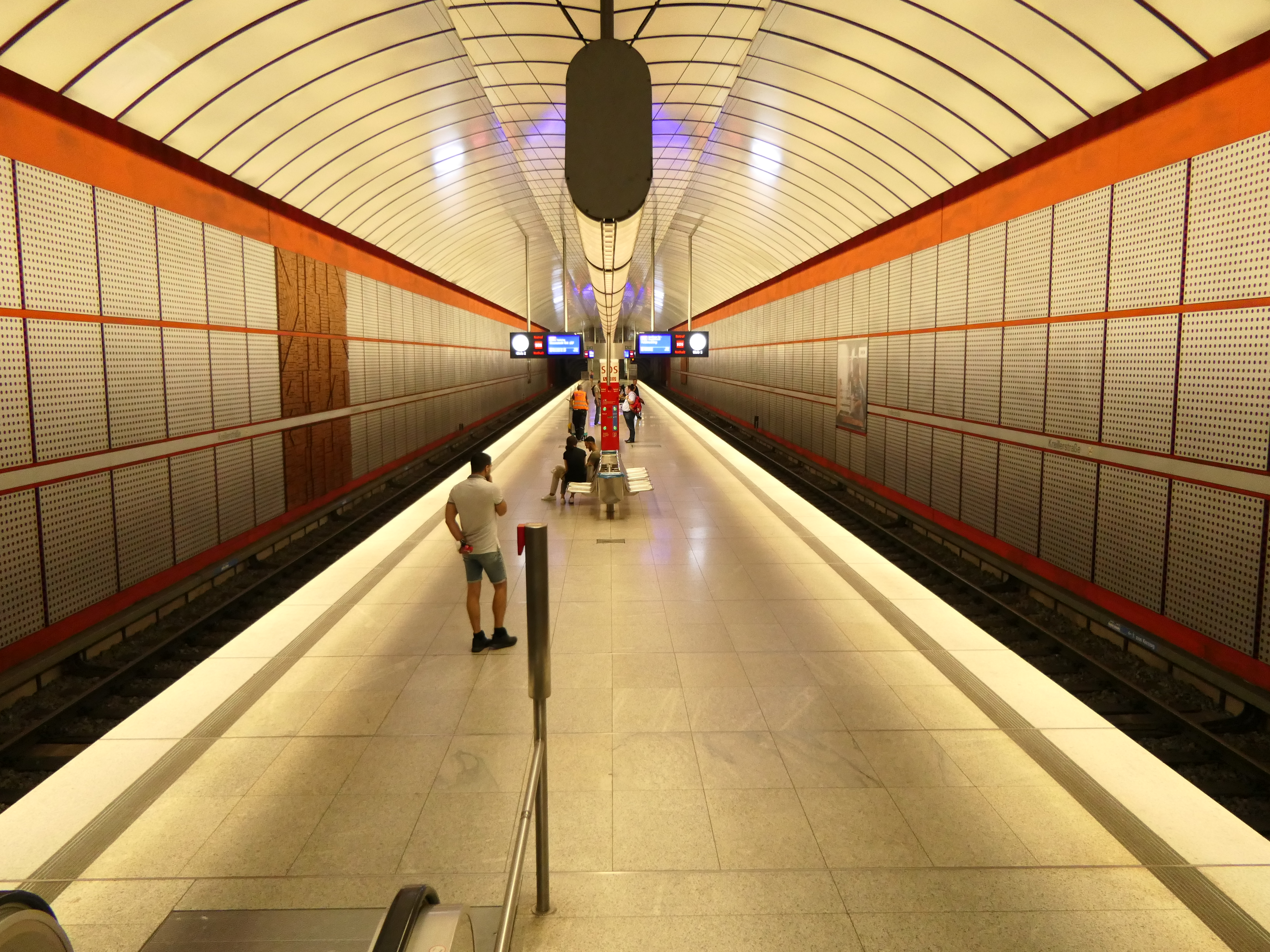
- Kreillerstraße station platform

General information
- Location: Berg am Laim, Munich, Bavaria; Germany
- Platforms: 2
- Tracks: 2

Construction
- Structure type: Underground
- Accessible: Yes

Other information
- Station code: n/a
- Category: Subway station
- Fare zone: : M

History
- Opened: 29 May 1999

Services
Preceding station	Munich U-Bahn	Following station
Josephsburg towards Feldmoching	U2	Trudering towards Messestadt Ost
Location
- Location within Bavaria Location within Germany Location within Europe

Kreillerstraße is a Munich U-Bahn station on line U2.

== Overview ==
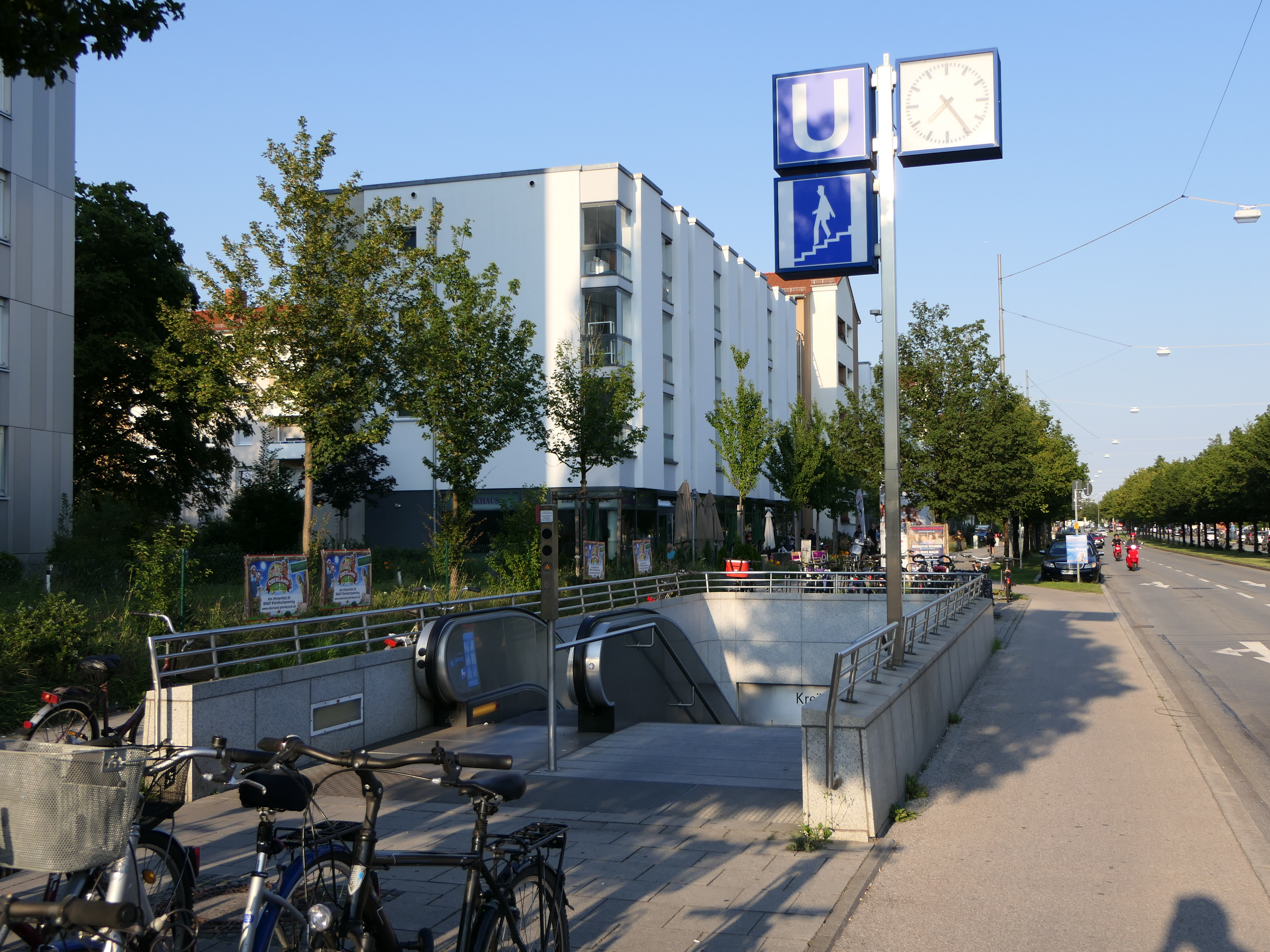
Entrance to Kreillerstraße station

The station was opened on 29 May 1999 and is situated in Berg am Laim. It is situated beneath the street with the same name, that leads to Wasserburg. The red walls are covered by perforated aluminium panels and bricks. The ceiling is also covered by bended aluminium panels. They reflect the light of the 3 light sources of which only 1 is visible. The floor is covered by granite slabs. At the western end of the station stairs and an elevator lead to a mezzanine and from there to the ground level with the junction Kreillerstraße/St.-Veit-Straße where the Tram 19 to Pasing leaves. At the eastern end you also reach a mezzanine using stairs and from there the Kreillerstraße.

The elevators are out of service from 13.01.2025 to 13.04.2025 due to renovation work.

== Stations ==
Line	Stations
U2	Feldmoching – Hasenbergl – Dülferstraße – Harthof – Am Hart – Frankfurter Ring – Milbertshofen – Scheidplatz – Hohenzollernplatz – Josephsplatz – Theresienstraße – Königsplatz – Hauptbahnhof – Sendlinger Tor – Fraunhoferstraße – Kolumbusplatz – Silberhornstraße – Untersbergstraße – Giesing – Karl-Preis-Platz – Innsbrucker Ring – Josephsburg – Kreillerstraße – Trudering – Moosfeld – Messestadt West – Messestadt Ost
