= Hohenzollernplatz station (Munich U-Bahn) =

Station of the Munich U-Bahn

Coordinates: 48°09′43″N 11°34′07″E

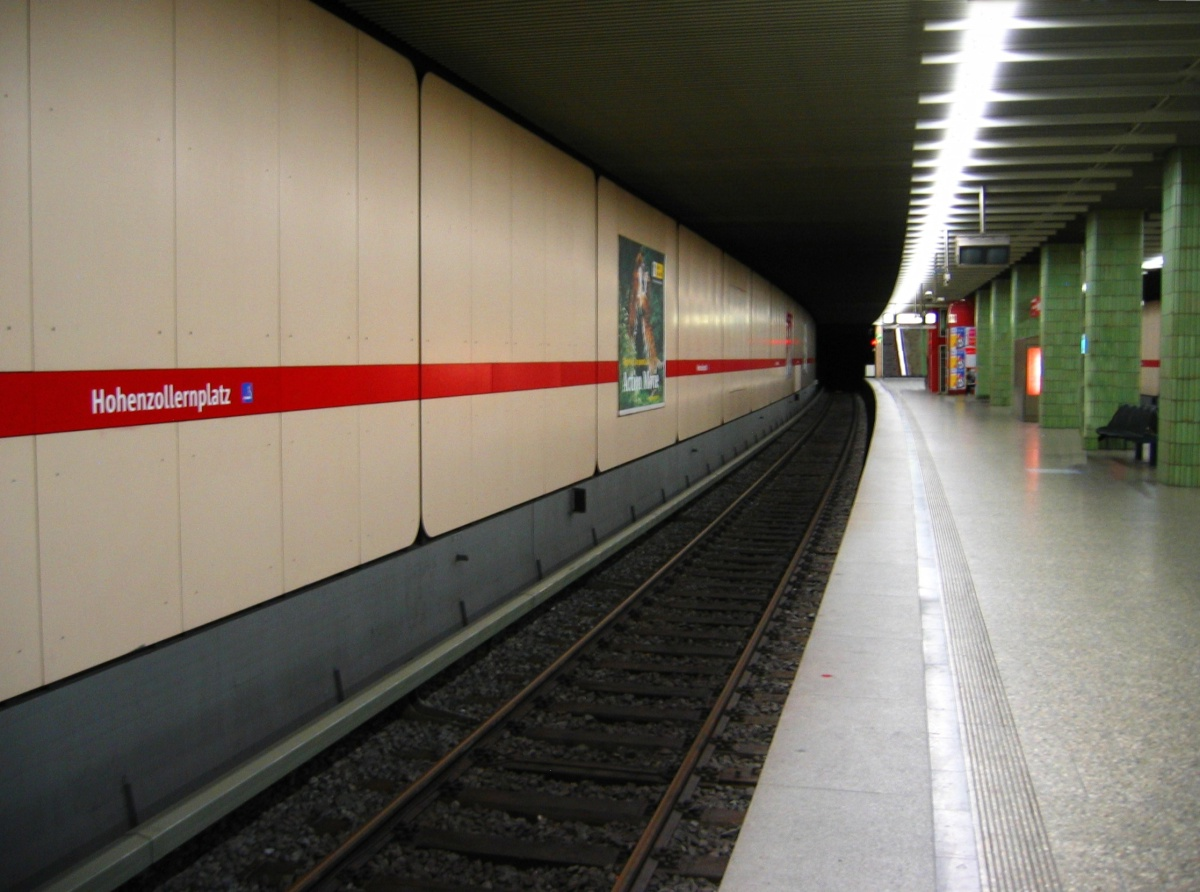
Hohenzollernplatz U-Bahn station

Hohenzollernplatz is an U-Bahn station in Munich on the U2. The station is also served by routes and of the Munich tramway.

| Preceding station | Munich U-Bahn | Following station |
|---|---|---|
| Scheidplatz towards Feldmoching | U2 | Josephsplatz towards Messestadt Ost |
| Scheidplatz towards Olympiazentrum | U8 | Josephsplatz towards Neuperlach Zentrum |
