= Michaelibad station =

Station of the Munich U-Bahn

Michaelibad
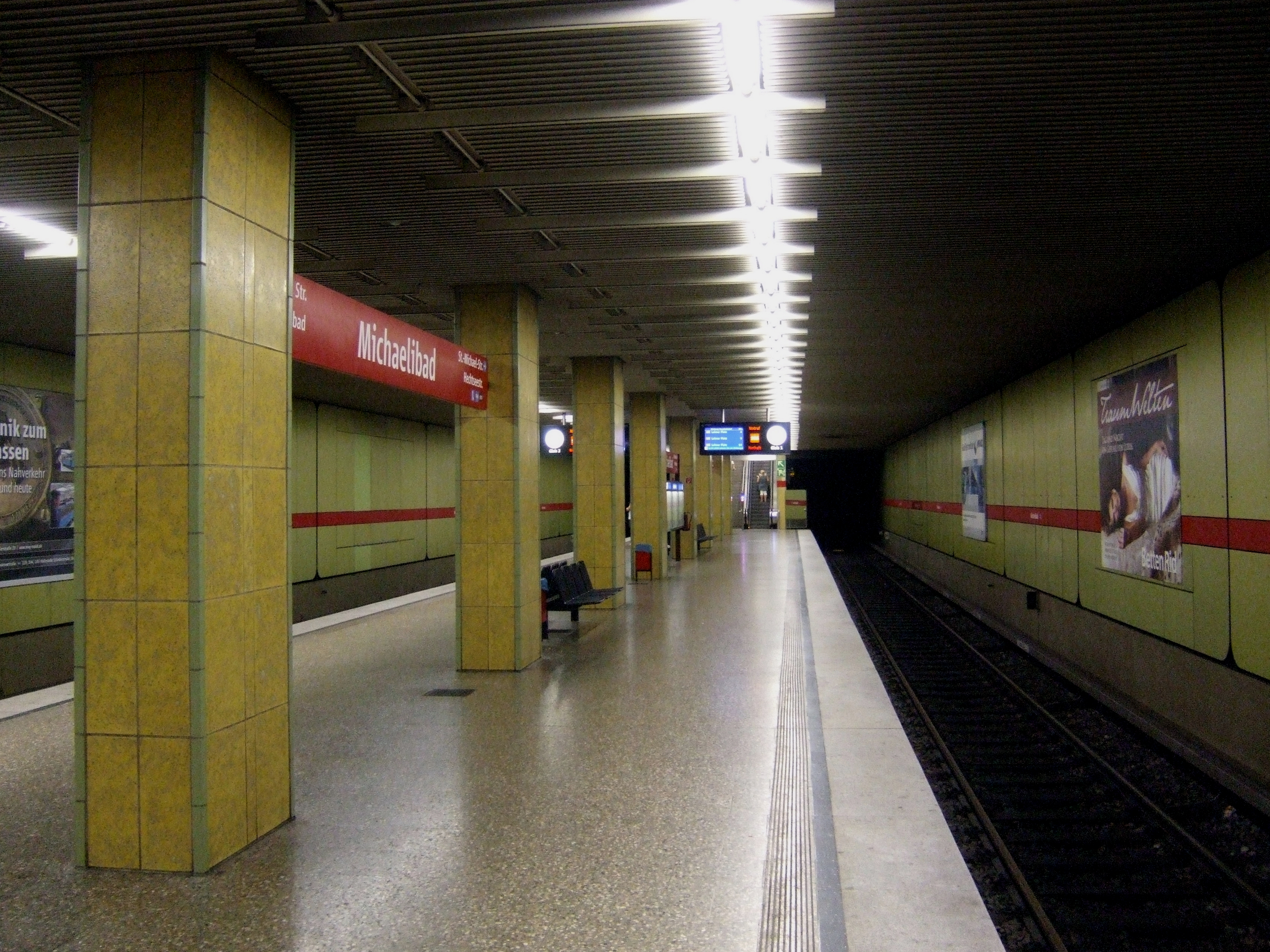

General information
- Location: Munich, Germany
- Coordinates: 48°07′06″N 11°37′55″E
- Platforms: Island platform
- Tracks: 2
- Connections: MVV buses

Construction
- Structure type: Underground
- Accessible: Yes

Other information
- Fare zone: : M

History
- Opened: 18 October 1980

Services
Preceding station	Munich U-Bahn	Following station
Innsbrucker Ring towards Laimer Platz	U5	Quiddestraße towards Neuperlach Süd
Innsbrucker Ring towards Olympia-Einkaufszentrum	U7	Quiddestraße towards Neuperlach Zentrum
Innsbrucker Ring towards Olympiazentrum	U8	Quiddestraße towards Neuperlach Zentrum
Location

Michaelibad is an underground station of the Munich U-Bahn. The station is located at Heinrich-Wieland-Straße and is named after the nearby natatorium and water park Michaelibad, which used to be a training location for the 1972 Summer Olympics. Today the U5 line runs here and the U7 reinforcement line since 12 December 2011, which only runs during rush hours. Until the opening of the U2 to the Munich trade fair, the station was a junction for the development of the Munich East. The bus station was closed in 2005.

The station looks similar to the other stations of the line with green wall panels and columns, covered with green ceramic tiles. A special feature is the ramp leading to the east to the barricade floor. The ceiling is covered with aluminium slats. Formerly four, today two light bands run along the platform.
