= Petuelring station =

Station of the Munich U-Bahn

Coordinates: 48°10′33″N 11°33′57″E

Petuelring
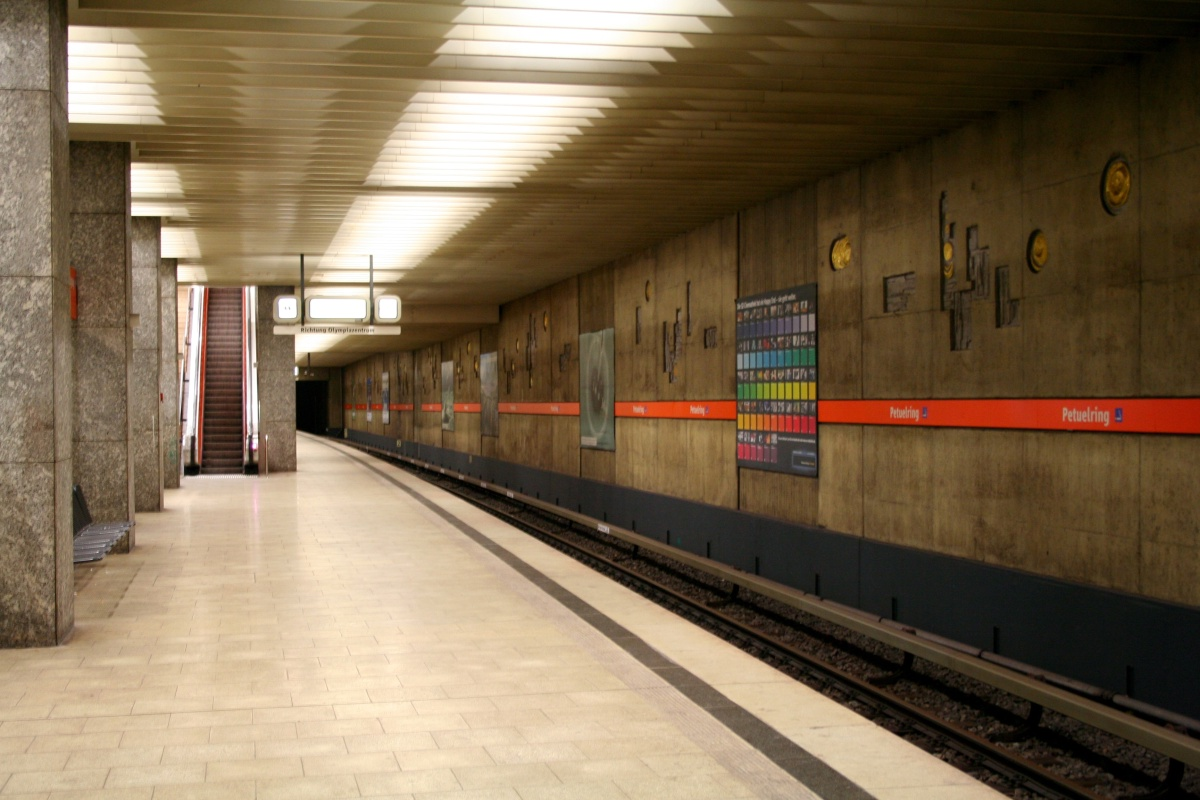

General information
- Connections: 27; MVV buses

Construction
- Structure type: Underground
- Accessible: Yes

Other information
- Fare zone: : M

Services
Preceding station	Munich U-Bahn	Following station
Olympiazentrum towards Munich-Moosach	U3	Scheidplatz towards Fürstenried West
Olympiazentrum Terminus	U8	Scheidplatz towards Neuperlach Zentrum
Location

Petuelring is an U-Bahn station in Munich on the U3. It was opened on 8 May 1972. It is also the northern terminus of route of the Munich tramway.
