= Quiddestraße station =

Station of the Munich U-Bahn

Quiddestraße
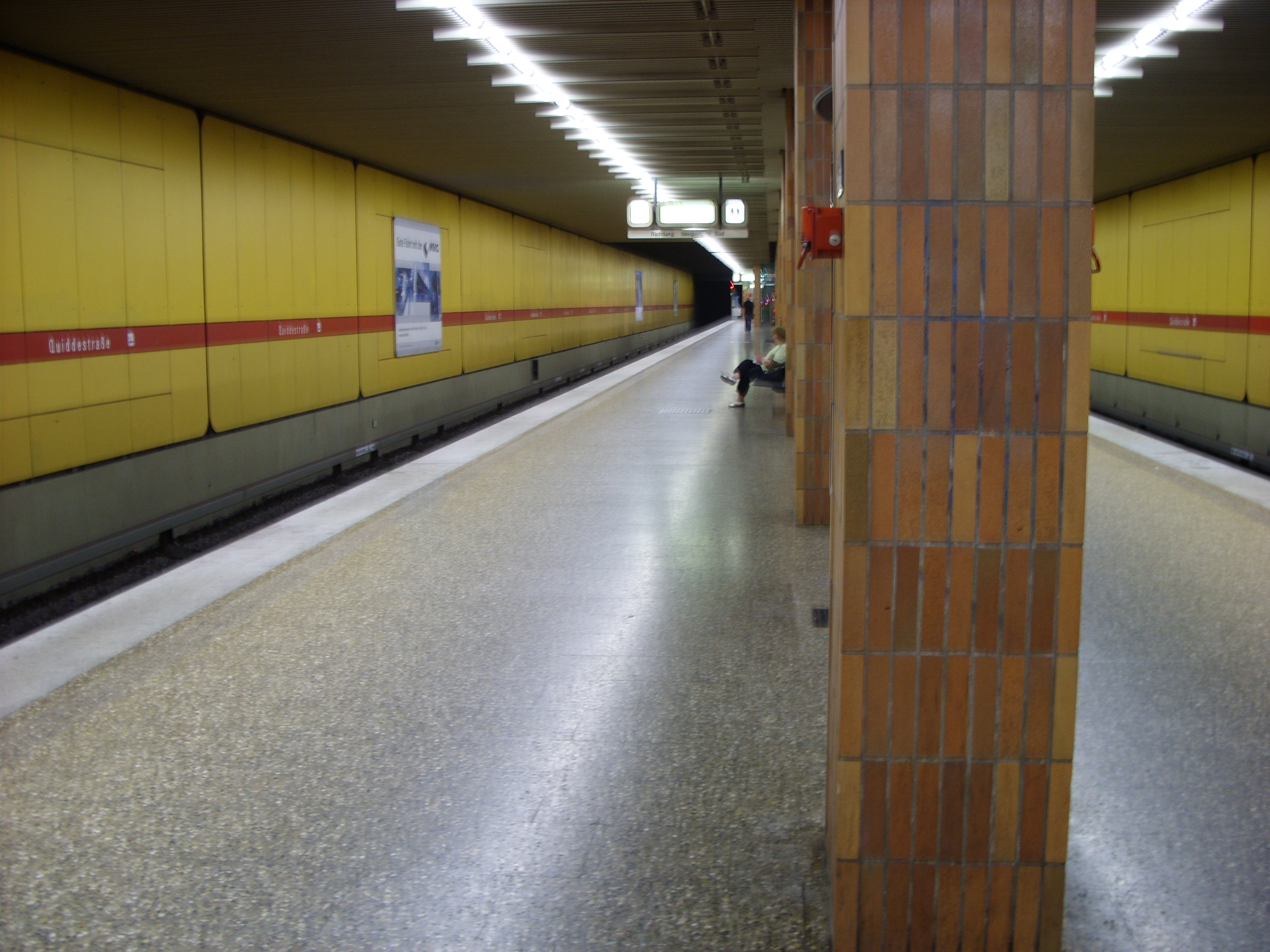

General information
- Location: Neuperlach, Ramersdorf-Perlach; Munich, Germany
- Coordinates: 48°06′30″N 11°38′49″E
- Platforms: Island platform
- Tracks: 2

Construction
- Structure type: Underground
- Accessible: Yes

Other information
- Fare zone: : M

Services
Preceding station	Munich U-Bahn	Following station
Michaelibad towards Laimer Platz	U5	Neuperlach Zentrum towards Neuperlach Süd
Michaelibad towards Olympia-Einkaufszentrum	U7	Neuperlach Zentrum Terminus
Michaelibad towards Olympiazentrum	U8	Neuperlach Zentrum Terminus
Location

Quiddestraße is an U-Bahn station in Munich on the U5.
