= Messestadt Ost station =

Station of the Munich U-Bahn

Messestadt Ost
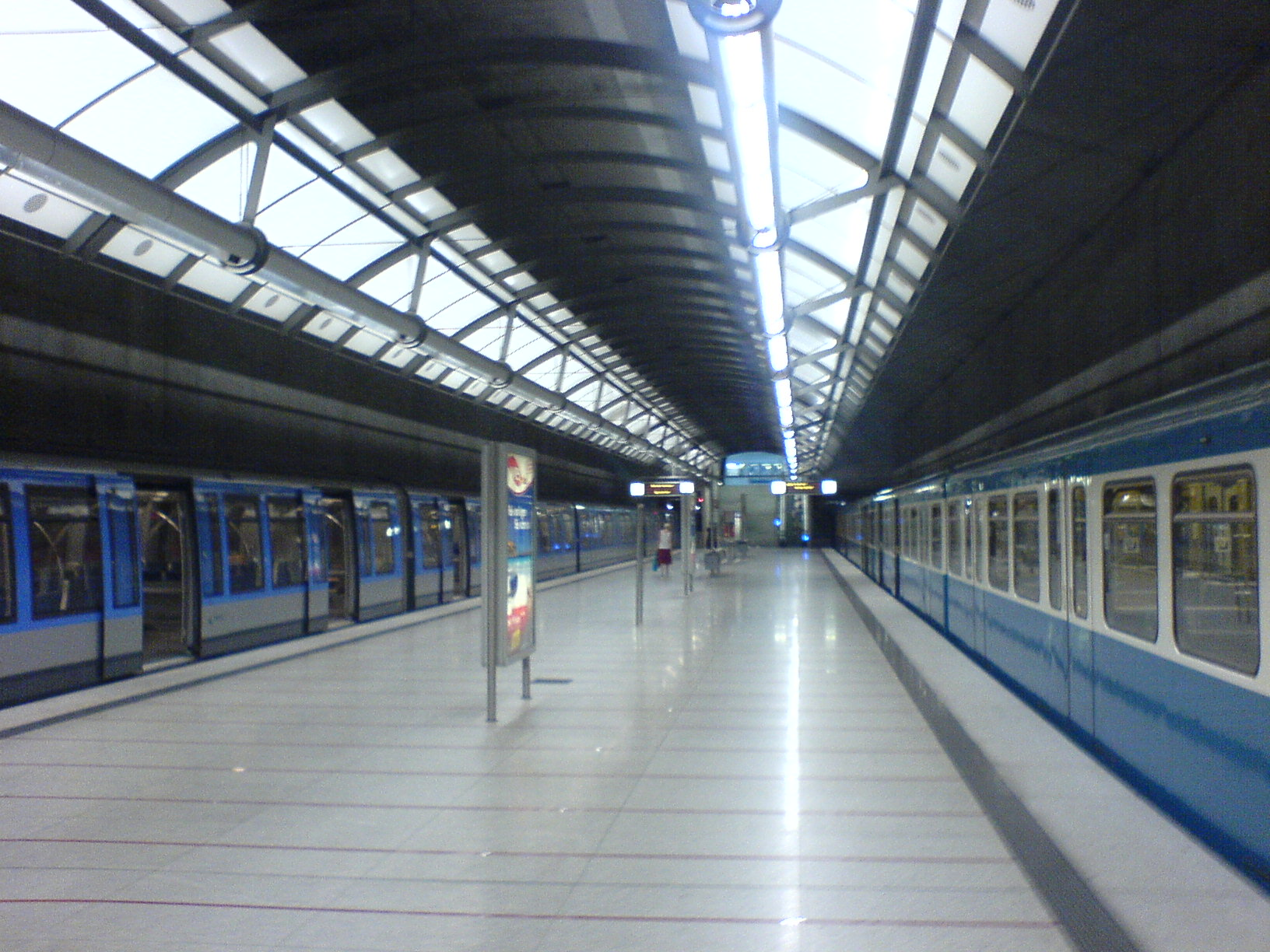
- Messestadt Ost

General information
- Other names: Riem Ost, Neu-Riem Ost
- Location: Trudering-Riem, Munich, Bavaria; Germany
- Coordinates: 48°08′00″N 11°42′13″E
- Platforms: 1 island platform
- Tracks: 2
- Connections: 186, 190, 234, 262

Construction
- Structure type: Underground
- Accessible: Yes

Other information
- Station code: n/a
- Category: Subway station
- Fare zone: : M and 1

History
- Opened: May 29, 1999

Services
Preceding station	Munich U-Bahn	Following station
Messestadt West towards Feldmoching	U2	Terminus
Location
- Location within Bavaria Location within Germany Location within Europe

Messestadt Ost is a Munich U-Bahn station on line U2.

== Overview ==
The station was opened on 29 May 1999 and is located in the below the Willy-Brandt-Allee in the Messestadt Riem neighbourhood, the eastern part of which it serves. The walls are concrete covered by wavy aluminium, intended to evoke the airplanes that used to land at the Munich-Riem Airport which the neighbourhood has replaced. The station is illuminated by two rows of neon tubes with a curved reflector, and the floor is covered by granite slabs with red lines perpendicular to the tracks. Escalators and stairs lead to a mezzanine at the eastern end where there are pictures exhibited from the construction period. At the exit there is a sundial where the time can be read on the wall. The codenames of the station were Riem Ost and Neu-Riem Ost.

== Stations ==
Line	Stations
U2	Feldmoching – Hasenbergl – Dülferstraße – Harthof – Am Hart – Frankfurter Ring – Milbertshofen – Scheidplatz – Hohenzollernplatz – Josephsplatz – Theresienstraße – Königsplatz – Hauptbahnhof – Sendlinger Tor – Fraunhoferstraße – Kolumbusplatz – Silberhornstraße – Untersbergstraße – Giesing – Karl-Preis-Platz – Innsbrucker Ring – Josephsburg – Kreillerstraße – Trudering – Moosfeld – Messestadt West – Messestadt Ost
