= Innsbrucker Ring station =

Station of the Munich U-Bahn

Innsbrucker Ring
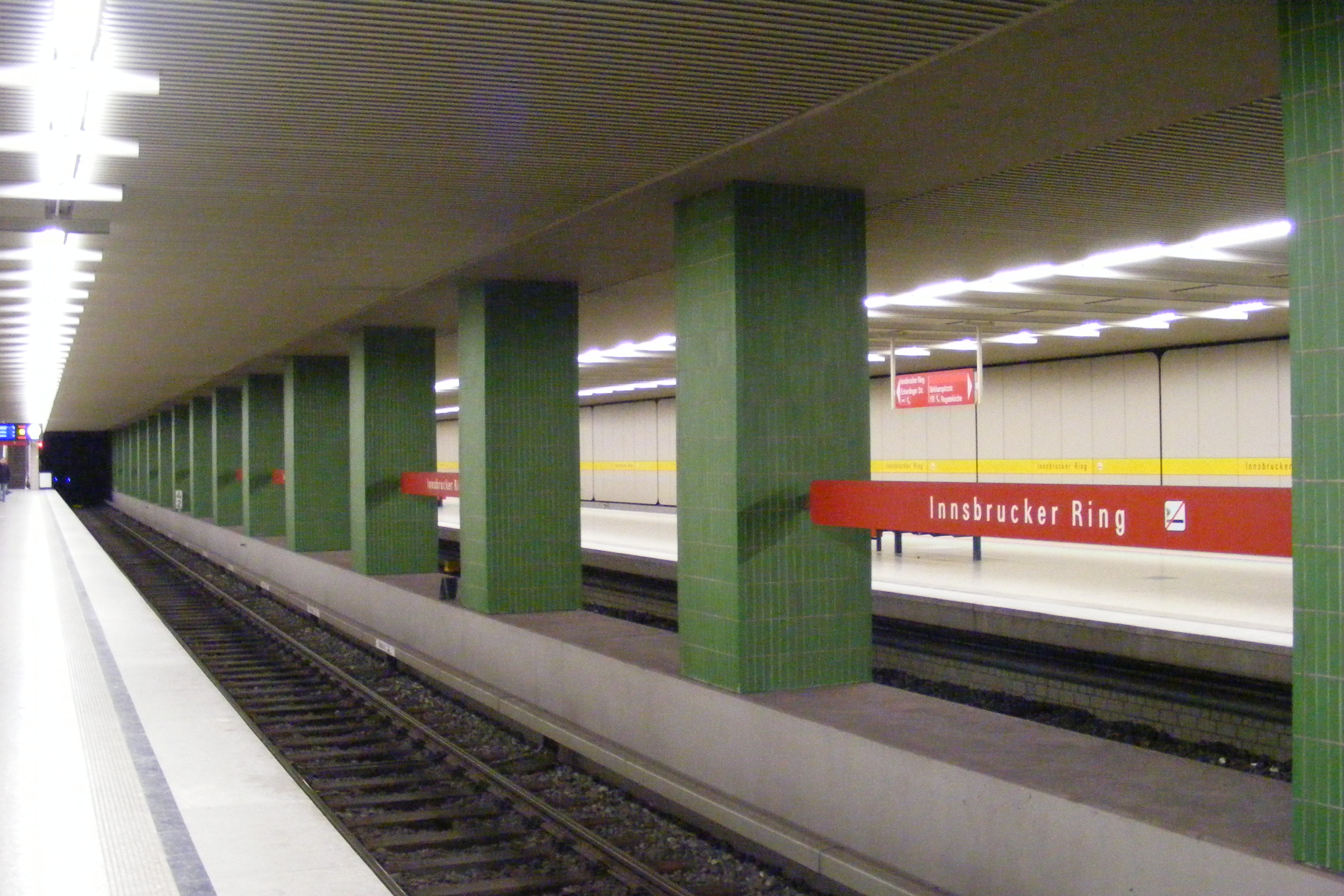

General information
- Location: Ramersdorf-Perlach; Munich, Germany
- Coordinates: 48°07′13″N 11°37′10″E
- Platforms: 2 island platforms
- Tracks: 4

Construction
- Structure type: Underground
- Accessible: Yes

Other information
- Fare zone: : M

History
- Opened: 18 October 1980

Services
Preceding station	Munich U-Bahn	Following station
Karl-Preis-Platz towards Feldmoching	U2	Josephsburg towards Messestadt Ost
Ostbahnhof towards Laimer Platz	U5	Michaelibad towards Neuperlach Süd
Karl-Preis-Platz towards Olympia-Einkaufszentrum	U7	Michaelibad towards Neuperlach Zentrum
Karl-Preis-Platz towards Olympiazentrum	U8	Michaelibad towards Neuperlach Zentrum
Location

Innsbrucker Ring is a U2 - U5 interchange station of the Munich U-Bahn. It is located under the Innsbrucker Ring and connects lines U2 and U5, allowing cross-platform interchange.

The distance of the U 2 line to Karl-Preis-Platz measures 868 m. The distance of the U 2 line to Josephsburg measures 1,576 m. The distance of the U 5 line to Ostbahnhof measures 1,602 m. The distance of the U 5 line to Michaelibad measures 982 m .

The station was opened on 1980-10-18.
