= Josephsplatz station =

Station of the Munich U-Bahn

Coordinates: 48°09′21″N 11°34′02″E

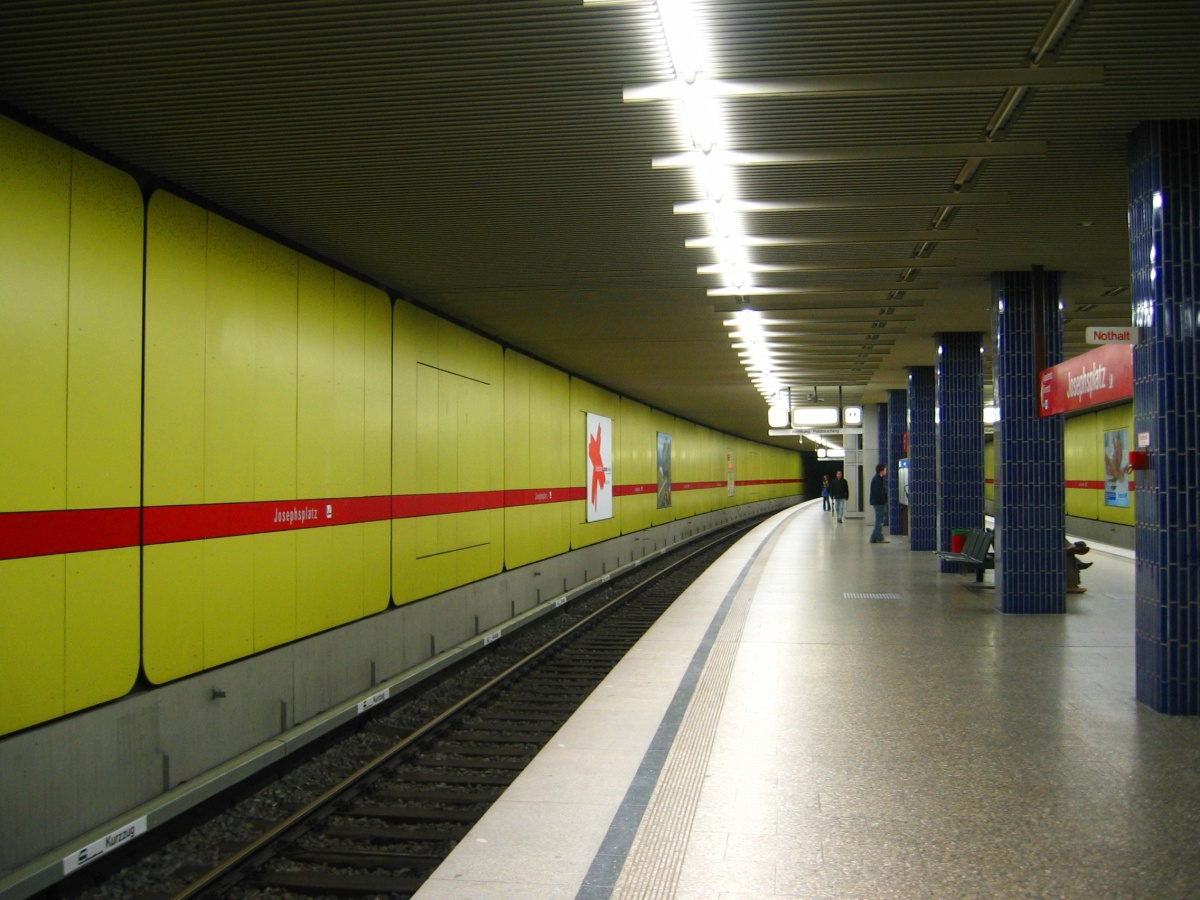
Josephsplatz U-Bahn station

Josephsplatz is an U-Bahn station in on the U2 located in Maxvorstadt, Munich, Bavaria, Germany.

Preceding station	Munich U-Bahn	Following station
Hohenzollernplatz towards Feldmoching	U2	Theresienstraße towards Messestadt Ost
Hohenzollernplatz towards Olympiazentrum	U8	Theresienstraße towards Neuperlach Zentrum
