= Scheidplatz station =

Station of the Munich U-Bahn

Scheidplatz
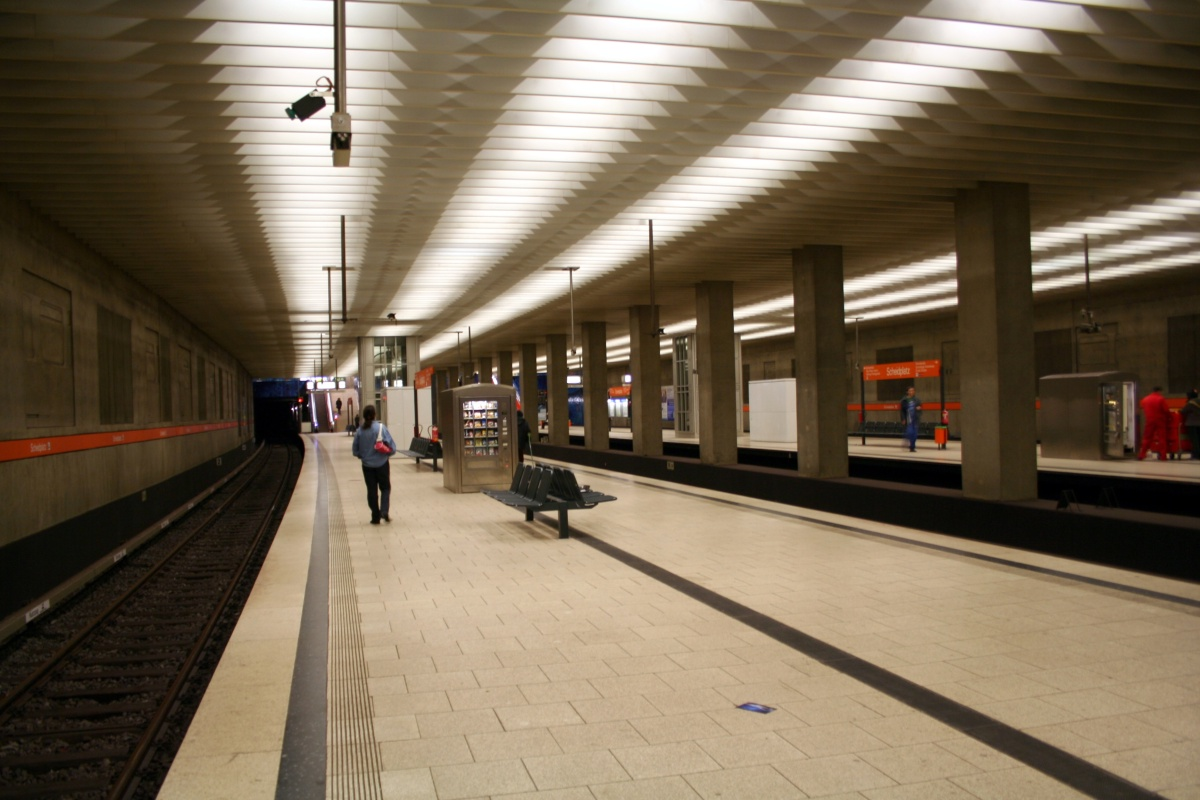

General information
- Location: Schwabing-West; Munich, Germany
- Coordinates: 48°10′18″N 11°34′24″E
- Platforms: 2 island platforms
- Tracks: 4
- Connections: 12 28; MVV buses

Construction
- Structure type: Underground
- Accessible: Yes

Other information
- Fare zone: : M

History
- Opened: 8 May 1972; 54 years ago

Services
Preceding station	Munich U-Bahn	Following station
Milbertshofen towards Feldmoching	U2	Hohenzollernplatz towards Messestadt Ost
Petuelring towards Munich-Moosach	U3	Bonner Platz towards Fürstenried West
Petuelring towards Olympiazentrum	U8	Hohenzollernplatz towards Neuperlach Zentrum
Location
- Location within Bavaria Location within Germany Location within Europe

Scheidplatz is a Munich U-Bahn interchange station in the borough of Schwabing-West. The station is also the northern terminus of route of the Munich tramway.
