= Theresienstraße station =

Station of the Munich U-Bahn

Coordinates: 48.15123°N 11.564277°E

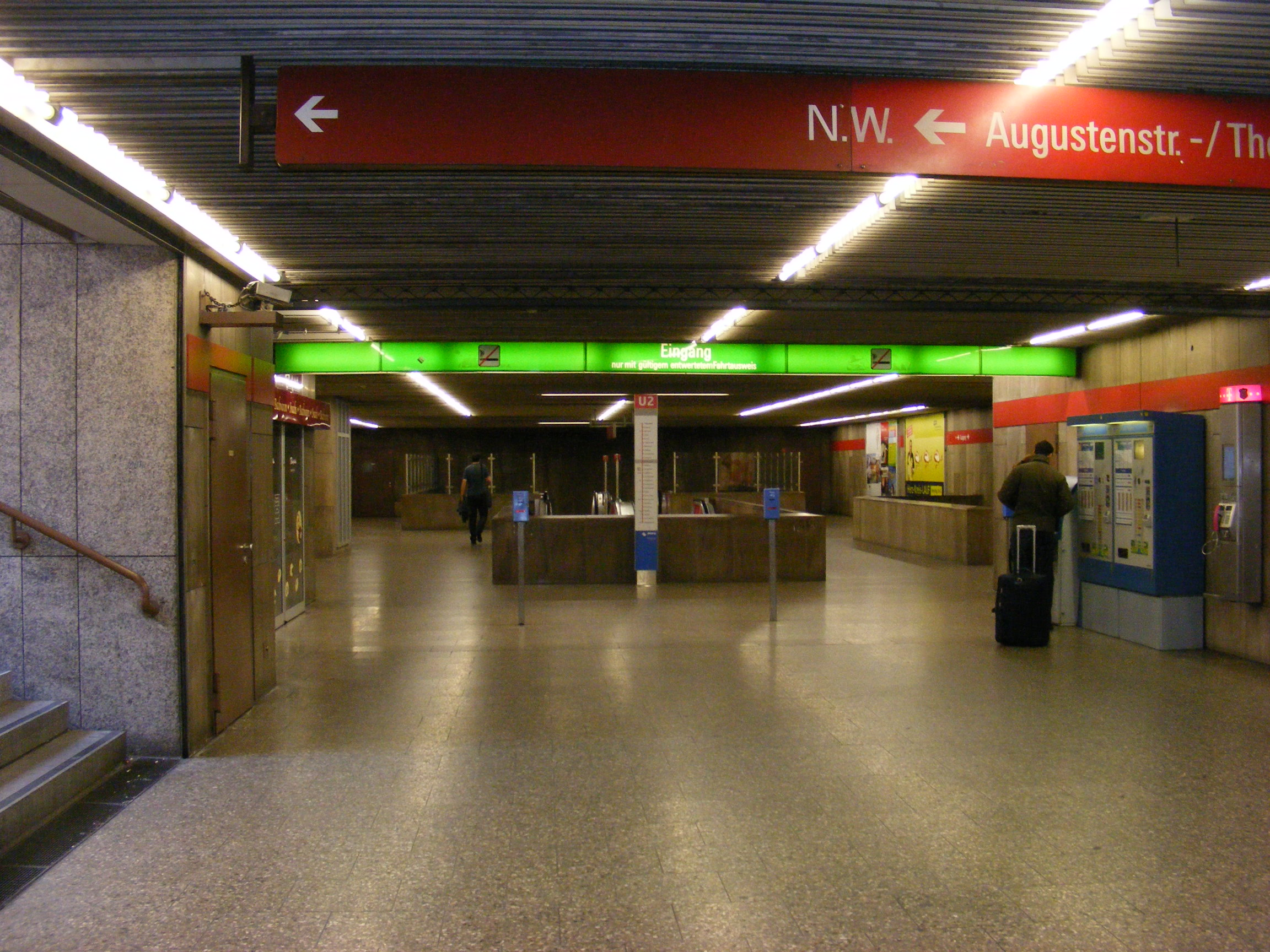
Intermediate storey of the station.

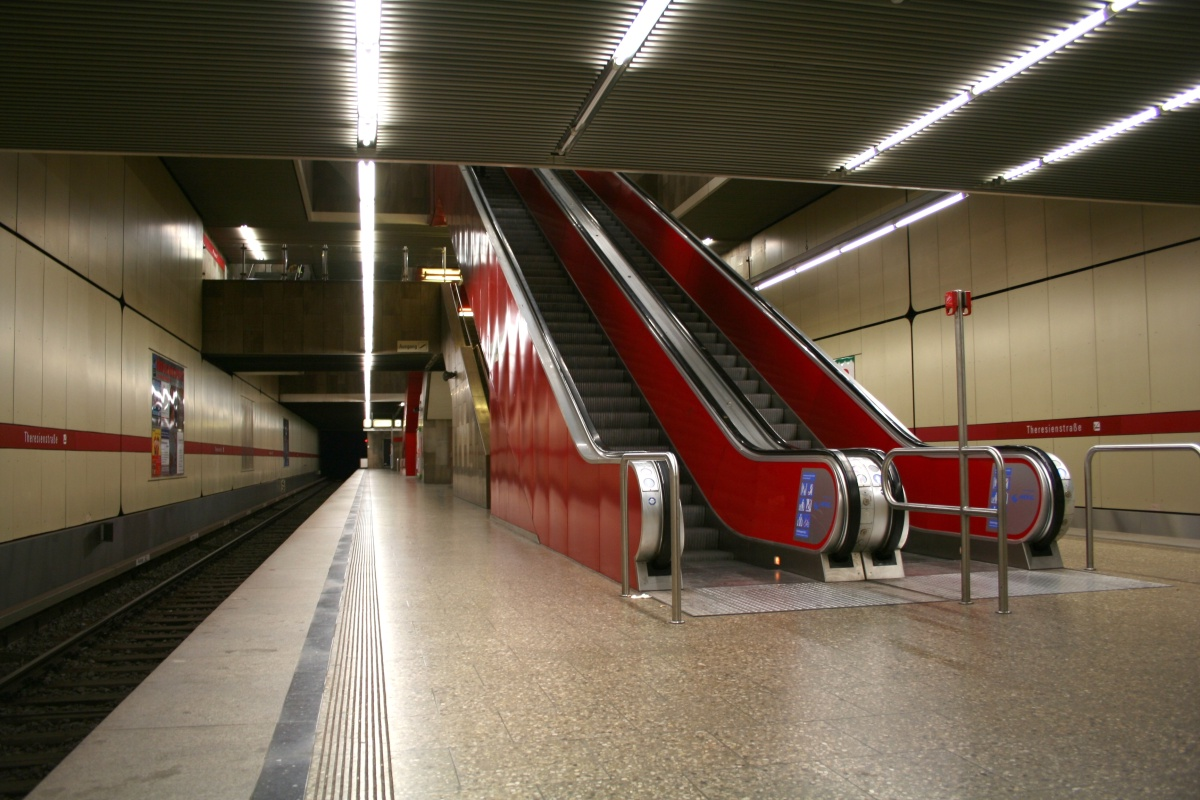
The station platform

Theresienstraße is an U-Bahn station in Maxvorstadt, Munich on the U2.

Preceding station	Munich U-Bahn	Following station
Josephsplatz towards Feldmoching	U2	Königsplatz towards Messestadt Ost
Josephsplatz towards Olympiazentrum	U8	Königsplatz towards Neuperlach Zentrum
