= Königsplatz station =

Station of the Munich U-Bahn

Coordinates: 48°08′42″N 11°33′48″E

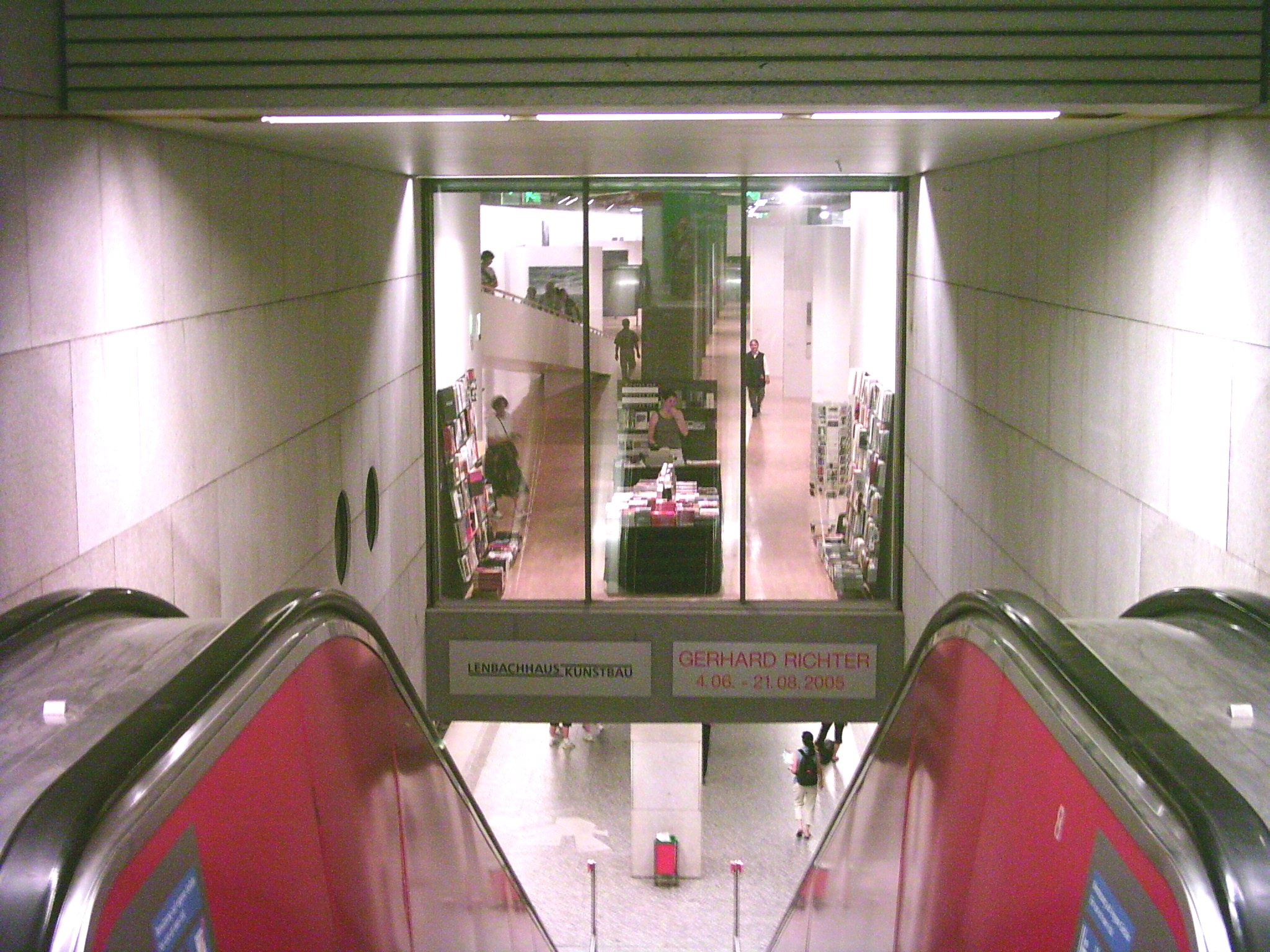
Königsplatz station with a part of the Lenbachhaus-Kunstbau.

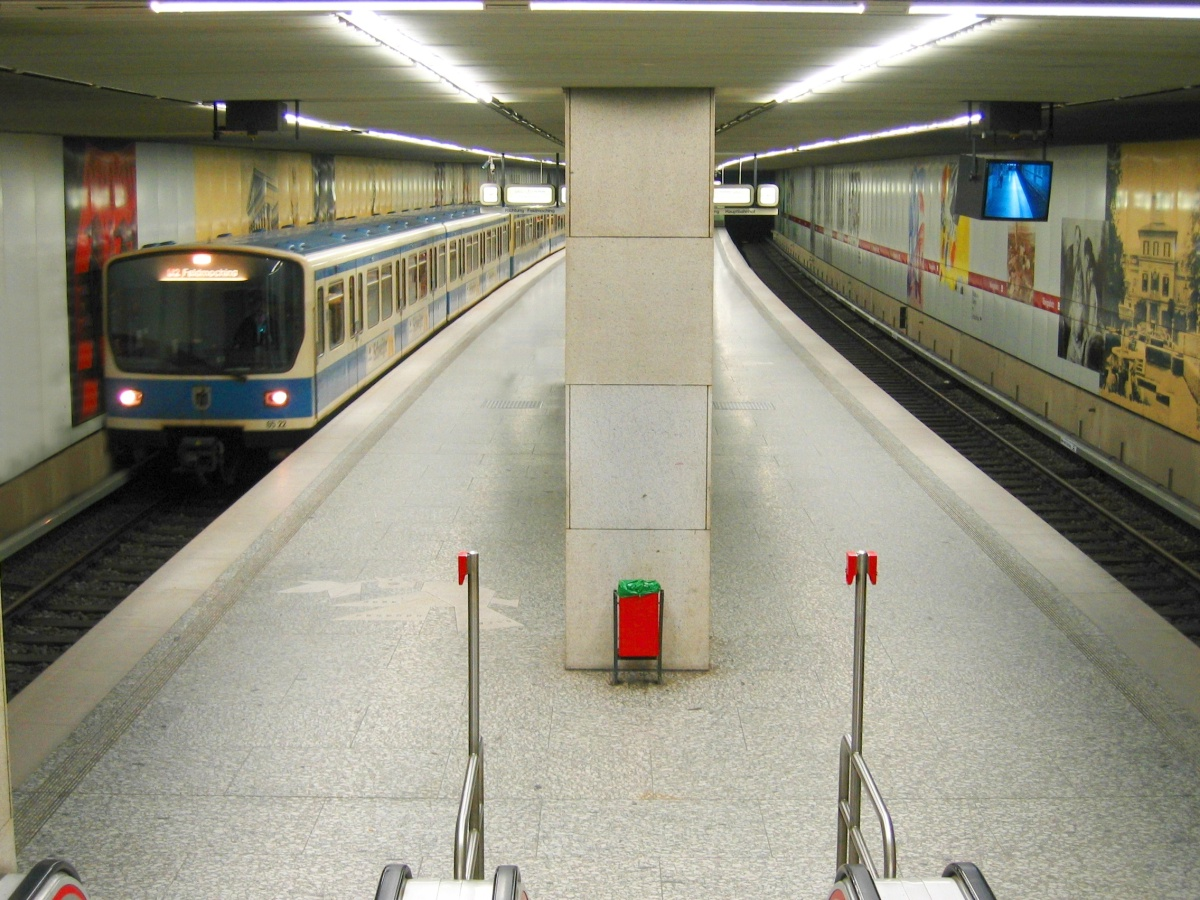
Platform of the station

Königsplatz is an U-Bahn station in Munich on the U2 line of the Munich U-Bahn system. It is located in the Maxvorstadt district.

The station is close to many museums including the Kunstareal. The walls behind the platforms are decorated with facsimiles of famous works of art. The station is named after the square above and opened on 18 October 1980. The floor is different from the other stations opened that year, with gray-blue Azul granite slabs. The pillars are covered with large brown stone and the ceiling has two lighting bands veneered with aluminum fins.

The station was planned under the name Brienner Straße, which runs through Königsplatz above.

== See also ==
- Königsplatz, Munich
- List of Munich U-Bahn stations

Preceding station	Munich U-Bahn	Following station
Theresienstraße towards Feldmoching	U2	Hauptbahnhof towards Messestadt Ost
Theresienstraße towards Olympiazentrum	U8	Hauptbahnhof towards Neuperlach Zentrum
