= Silberhornstraße station =

Station of the Munich U-Bahn

Coordinates: 48°06′53″N 11°34′50″E

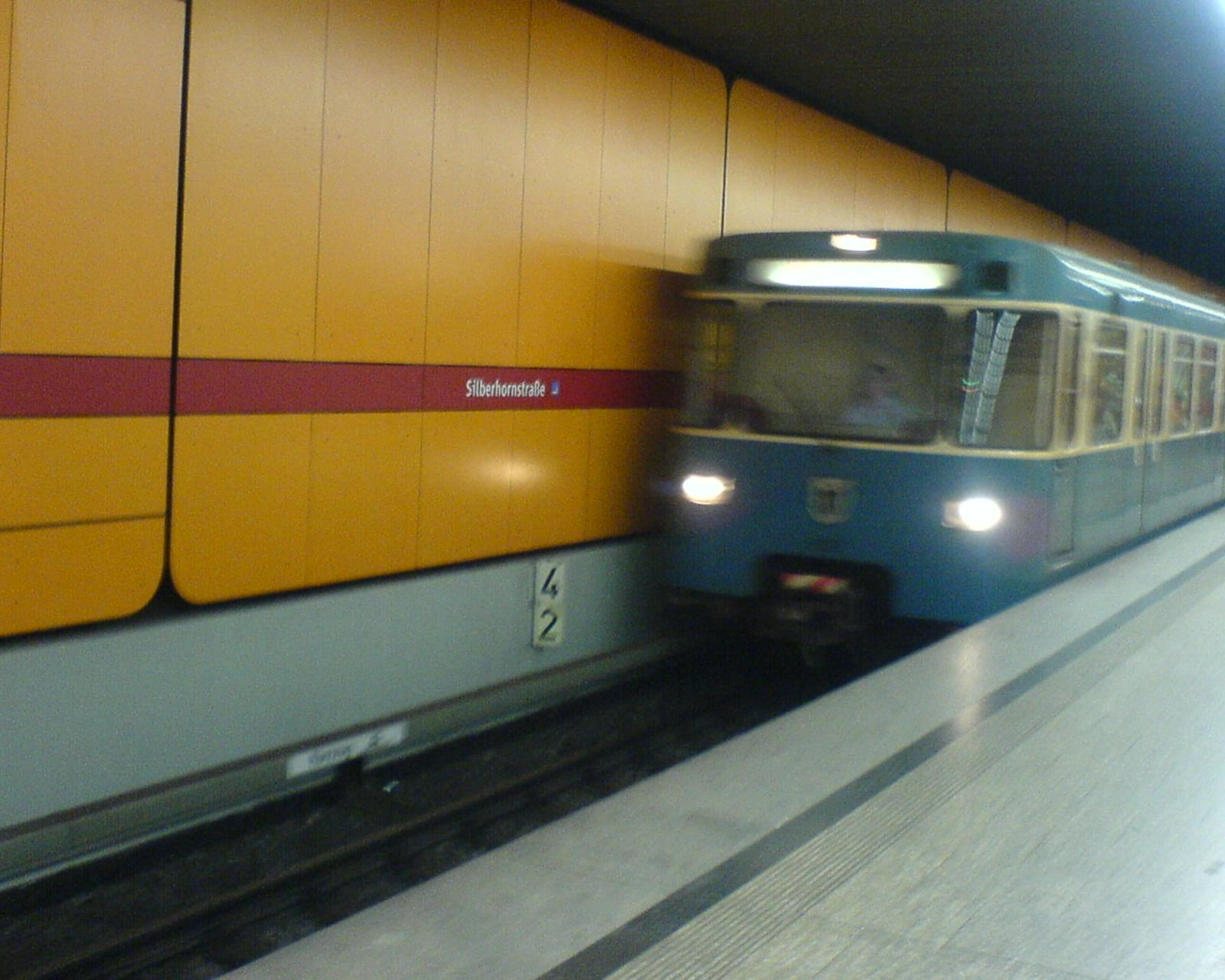
Platform of Silberhornstraße station.

Silberhornstraße is an U-Bahn station in Munich on the U2 and U7. It is located in upper Giesing. The station is also served by routes and of the Munich tramway.

Preceding station	Munich U-Bahn	Following station
Kolumbusplatz towards Feldmoching	U2	Untersbergstraße towards Messestadt Ost
Kolumbusplatz towards Olympia-Einkaufszentrum	U7	Untersbergstraße towards Neuperlach Zentrum
Kolumbusplatz towards Olympiazentrum	U8	Untersbergstraße towards Neuperlach Zentrum
