= Untersbergstraße station =

Station of the Munich U-Bahn

Coordinates: 48°06′45″N 11°35′15″E

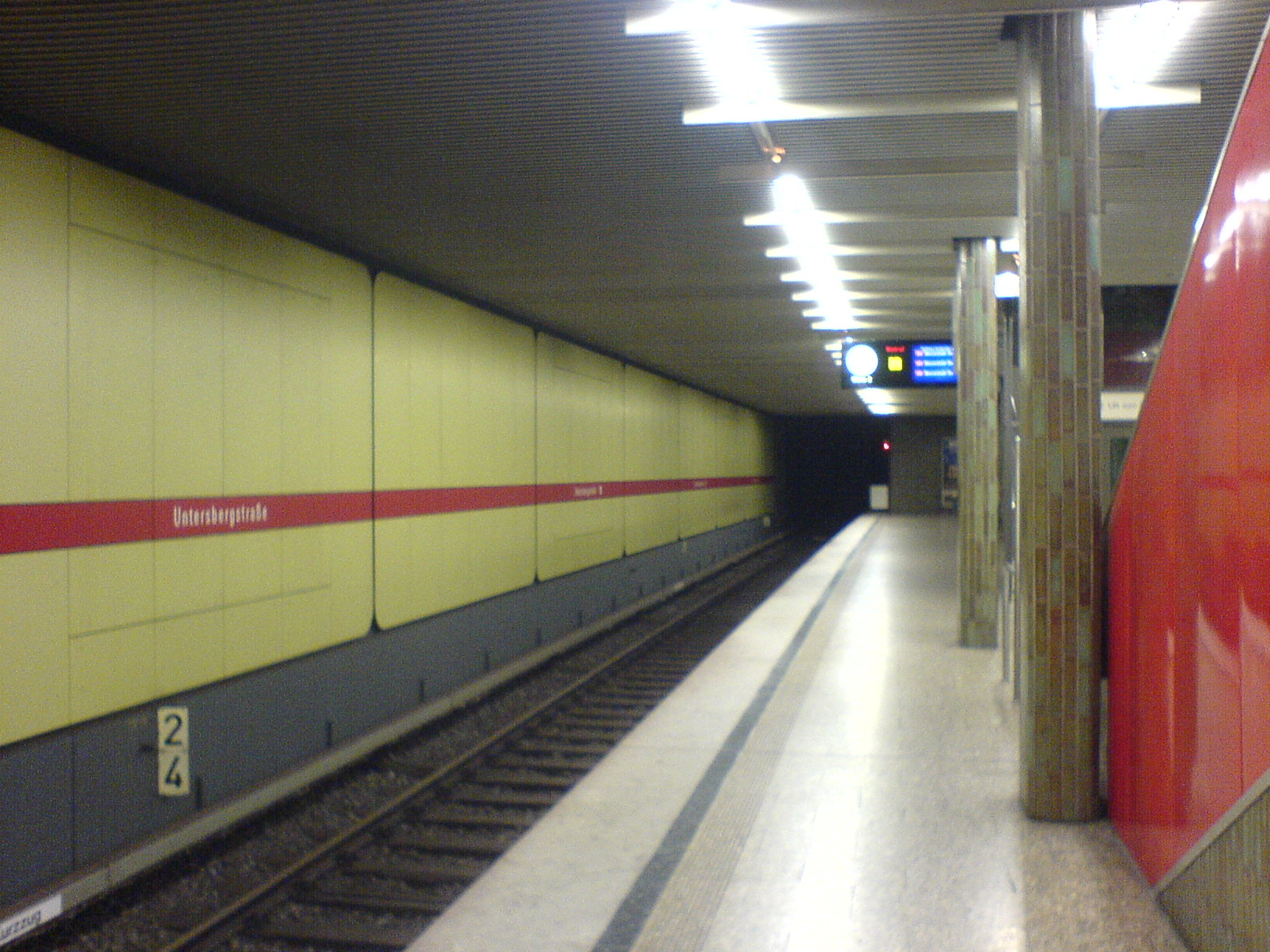
Platform of the Untersbergstraße subway station.

Untersbergstraße is an U-Bahn station in Munich on the U2 and U7. It is located in Giesing. It is named after the mountain "Untersberg," which lies between Salzburg and Berchtesgaden in the German-Austrian border area. It is a part of Zone M.

Preceding station	Munich U-Bahn	Following station
Silberhornstraße towards Feldmoching	U2	Giesing towards Messestadt Ost
Silberhornstraße towards Olympia-Einkaufszentrum	U7	Giesing towards Neuperlach Zentrum
Silberhornstraße towards Olympiazentrum	U8	Giesing towards Neuperlach Zentrum
