= Josephsburg station =

Station of the Munich U-Bahn

Coordinates: 48°07′36″N 11°38′03″E

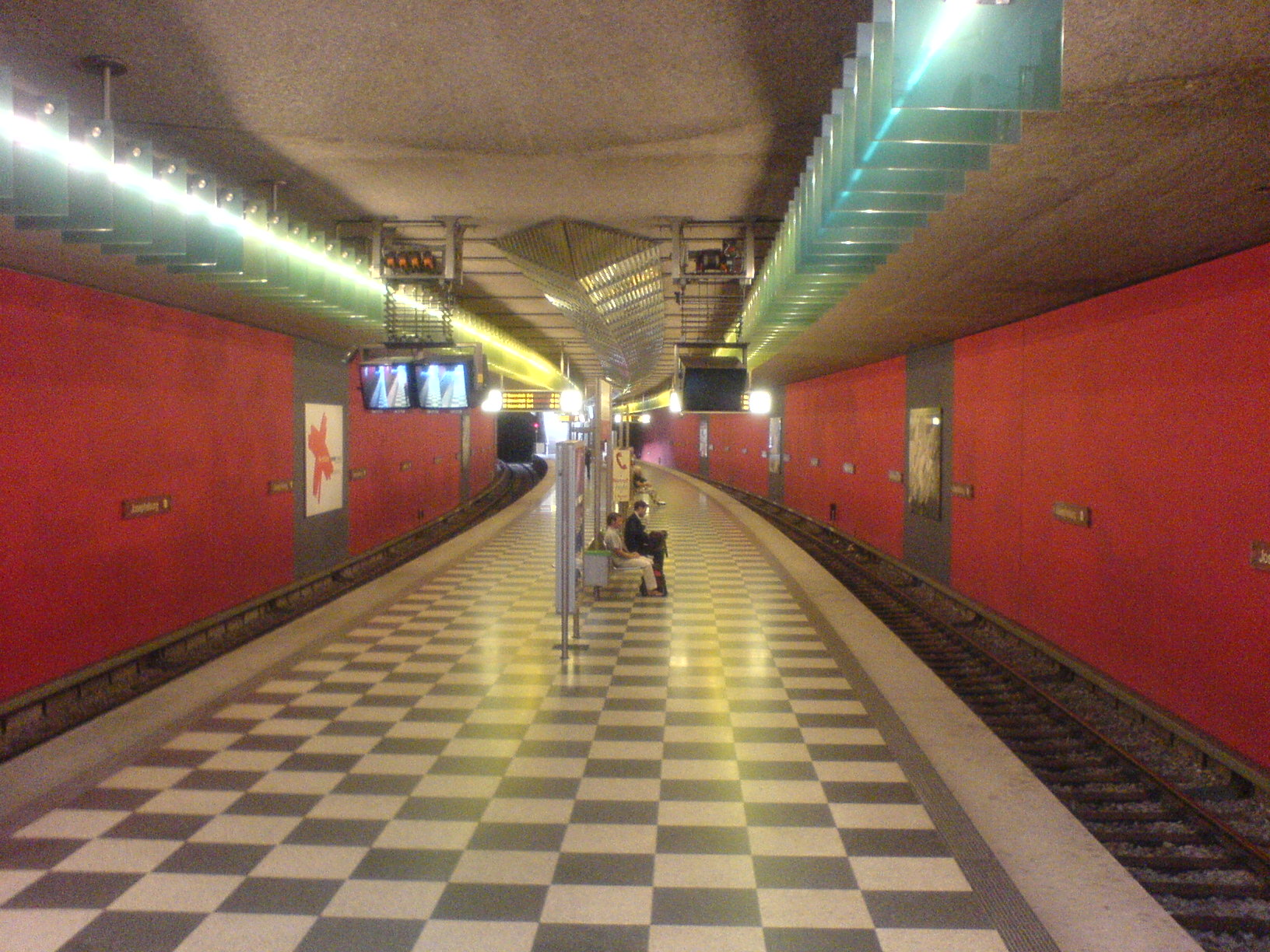
The station (platform)

Josephsburg is an U-Bahn station in Munich on the U2.

Preceding station	Munich U-Bahn	Following station
Innsbrucker Ring towards Feldmoching	U2	Kreillerstraße towards Messestadt Ost
