= Am Hart station =

Station of the Munich U-Bahn

Coordinates: 48°11′45″N 11°34′19″E

Am Hart
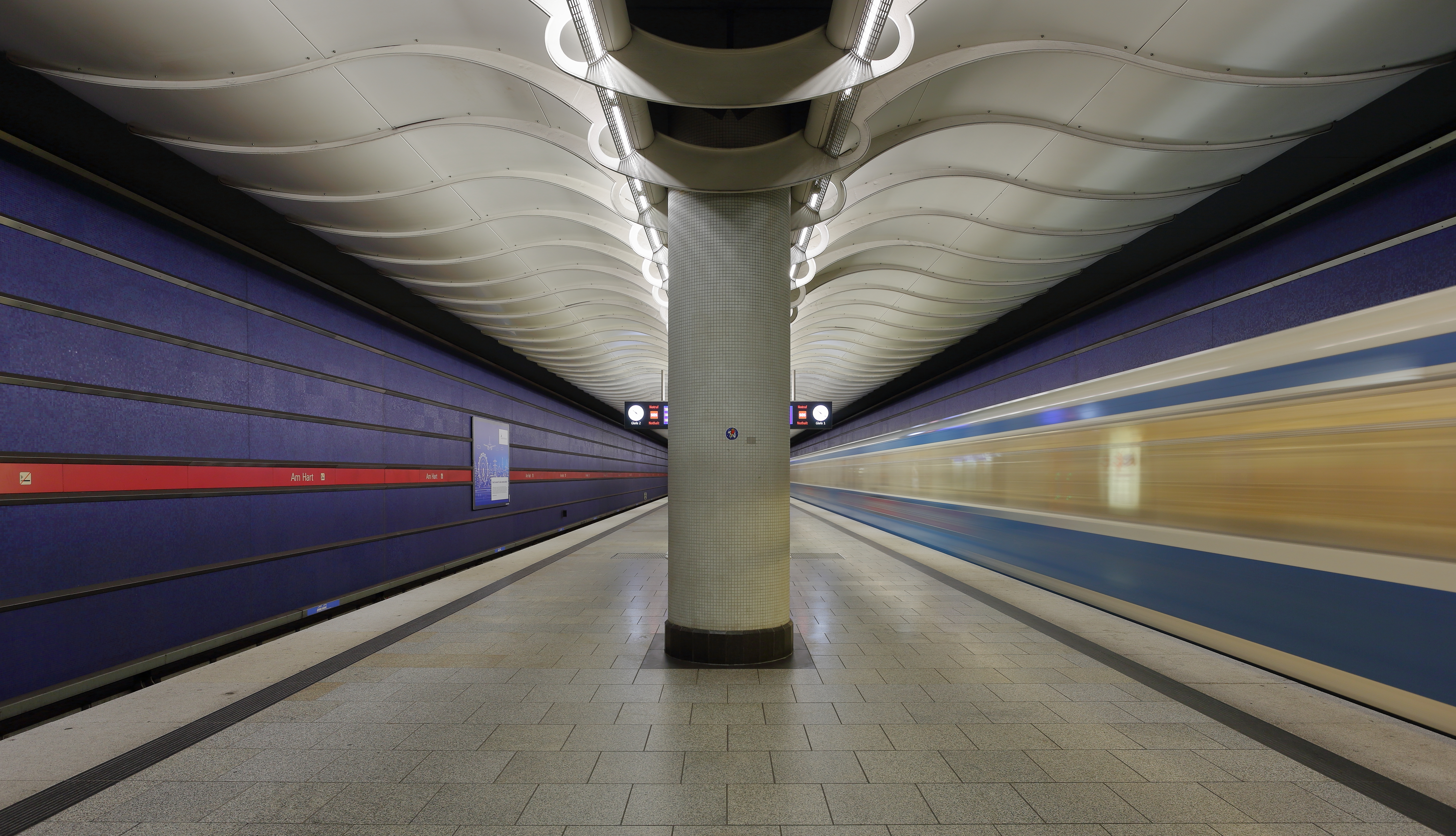

General information
- Platforms: 1 island platform
- Tracks: 2
- Connections: MVV buses

Construction
- Structure type: Underground
- Accessible: Yes

Other information
- Fare zone: : M and 1

Services
Preceding station	Munich U-Bahn	Following station
Harthof towards Feldmoching	U2	Frankfurter Ring towards Messestadt Ost
Location
- Location within Bavaria Location within Germany Location within Europe

Am Hart is an U-Bahn station in Munich on the U2.
