= Dülferstraße station =

Station of the Munich U-Bahn

Coordinates: 48°12′44″N 11°33′48″E

Dülferstraße

General information
- Location: Schleißheimer Straße/Dülferstraße; 80933 Munich; Bavaria; Germany
- Owner: Stadtwerke München
- Operator: Münchner Verkehrsgesellschaft
- Platforms: 1 island platform
- Tracks: 2
- Connections: 60 141 172 N41 N76

Construction
- Structure type: Underground
- Accessible: yes

Other information
- Fare zone: : M and 1

Services
| Preceding station | Munich U-Bahn | Following station |
|---|---|---|
| Hasenbergl towards Feldmoching | U2 | Harthof towards Messestadt Ost |
Location
- Location within Bavaria Location within Germany Location within Europe

Dülferstraße is an U-Bahn station in Munich on the U2.
