= Frankfurter Ring station =

Station of the Munich U-Bahn

Coordinates: 48°11′12″N 11°34′22″E

Frankfurter Ring is an U-Bahn station in Munich on the U2. It is located next to the same-named street Frankfurter Ring.

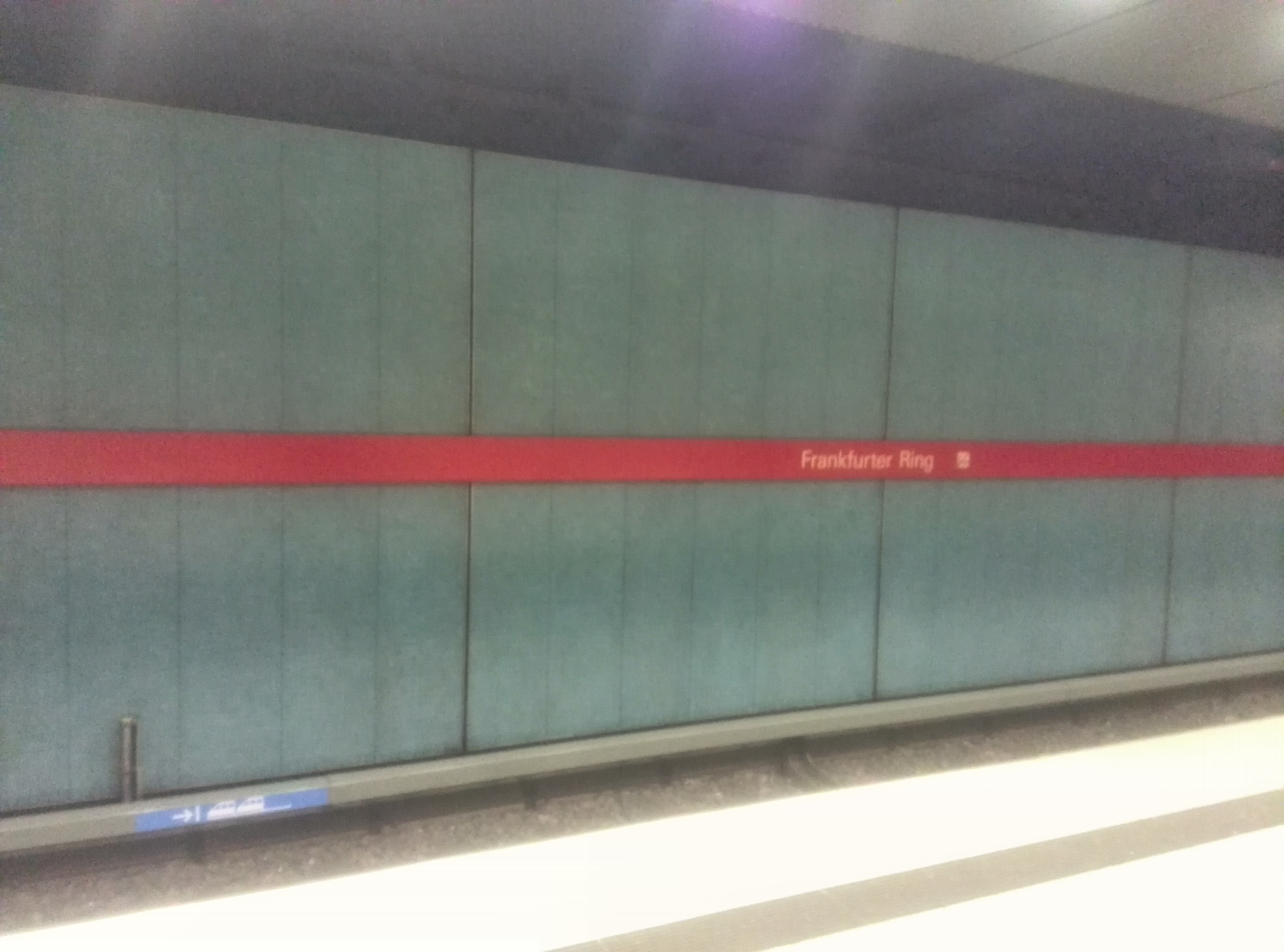

Preceding station	Munich U-Bahn	Following station
Am Hart towards Feldmoching	U2	Milbertshofen towards Messestadt Ost
