= Milbertshofen station =

Station of the Munich U-Bahn

Coordinates: 48°10′49″N 11°34′23″E

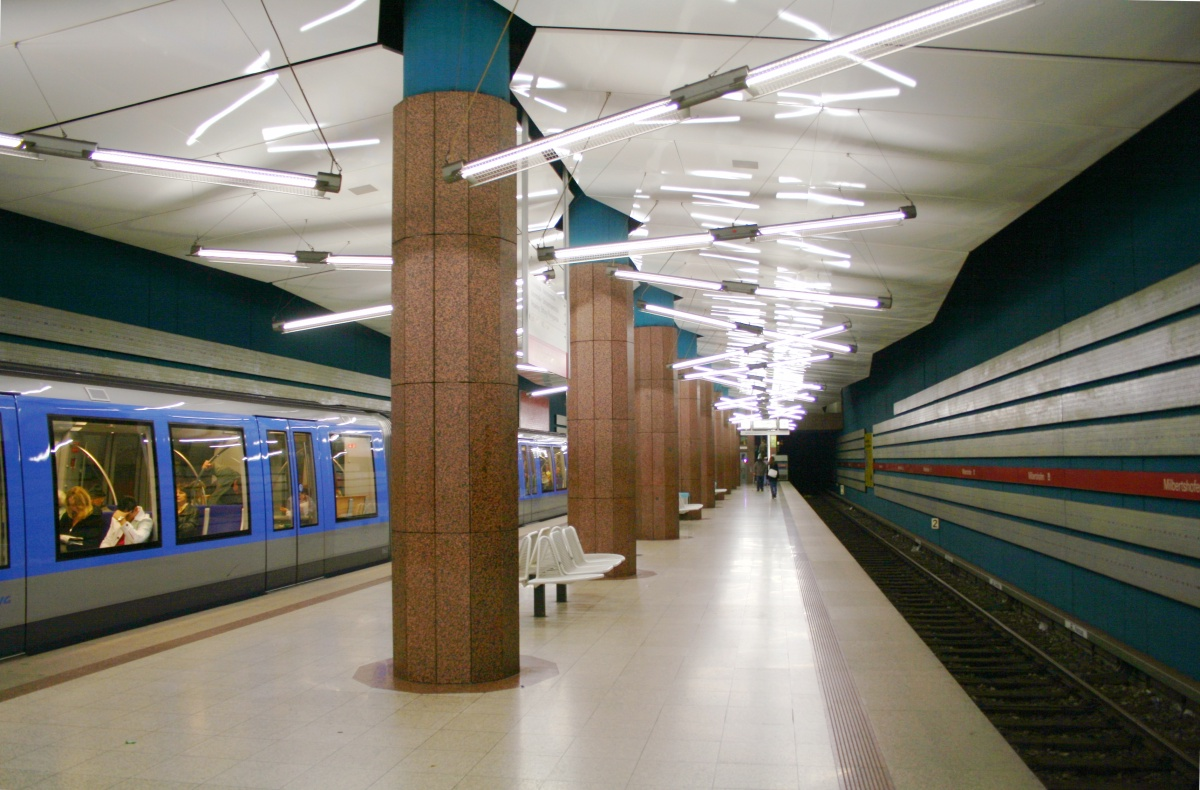
Milbertshofen U-Bahn station

Milbertshofen is an U-Bahn station in Munich on the U2.

Preceding station	Munich U-Bahn	Following station
Frankfurter Ring towards Feldmoching	U2	Scheidplatz towards Messestadt Ost
