= Harthof station =

Station of the Munich U-Bahn

Coordinates: 48°12′15.11″N 11°34′10.53″E

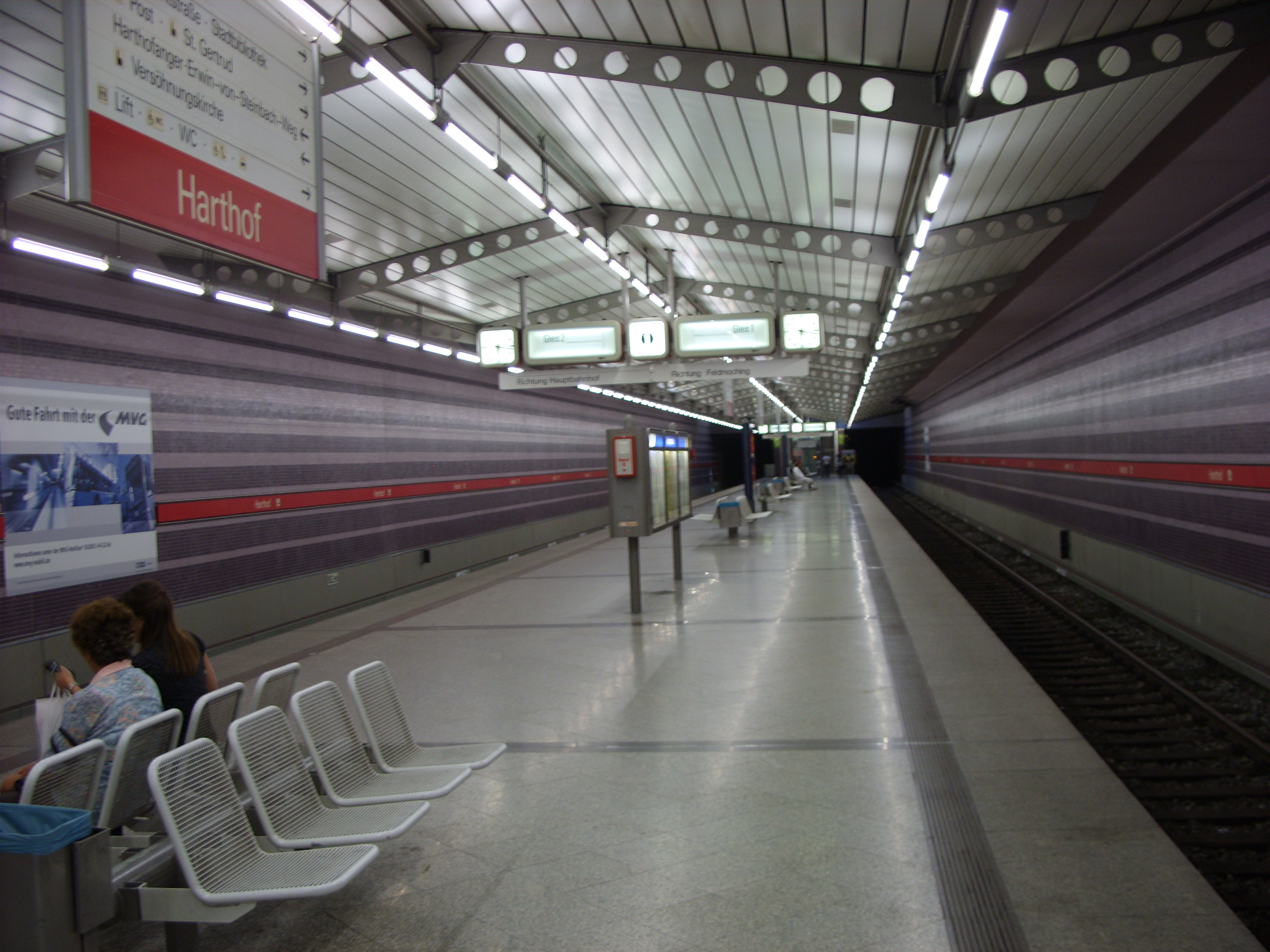
Harthof U-Bahn station

Harthof is an U-Bahn station in Munich, Germany.

Preceding station	Munich U-Bahn	Following station
Dülferstrasse towards Feldmoching	U2	Am Hart towards Messestadt Ost
