= Hasenbergl station =

Northwestern station of the Munich U-Bahn

Coordinates: 48°12′48″N 11°33′18″E

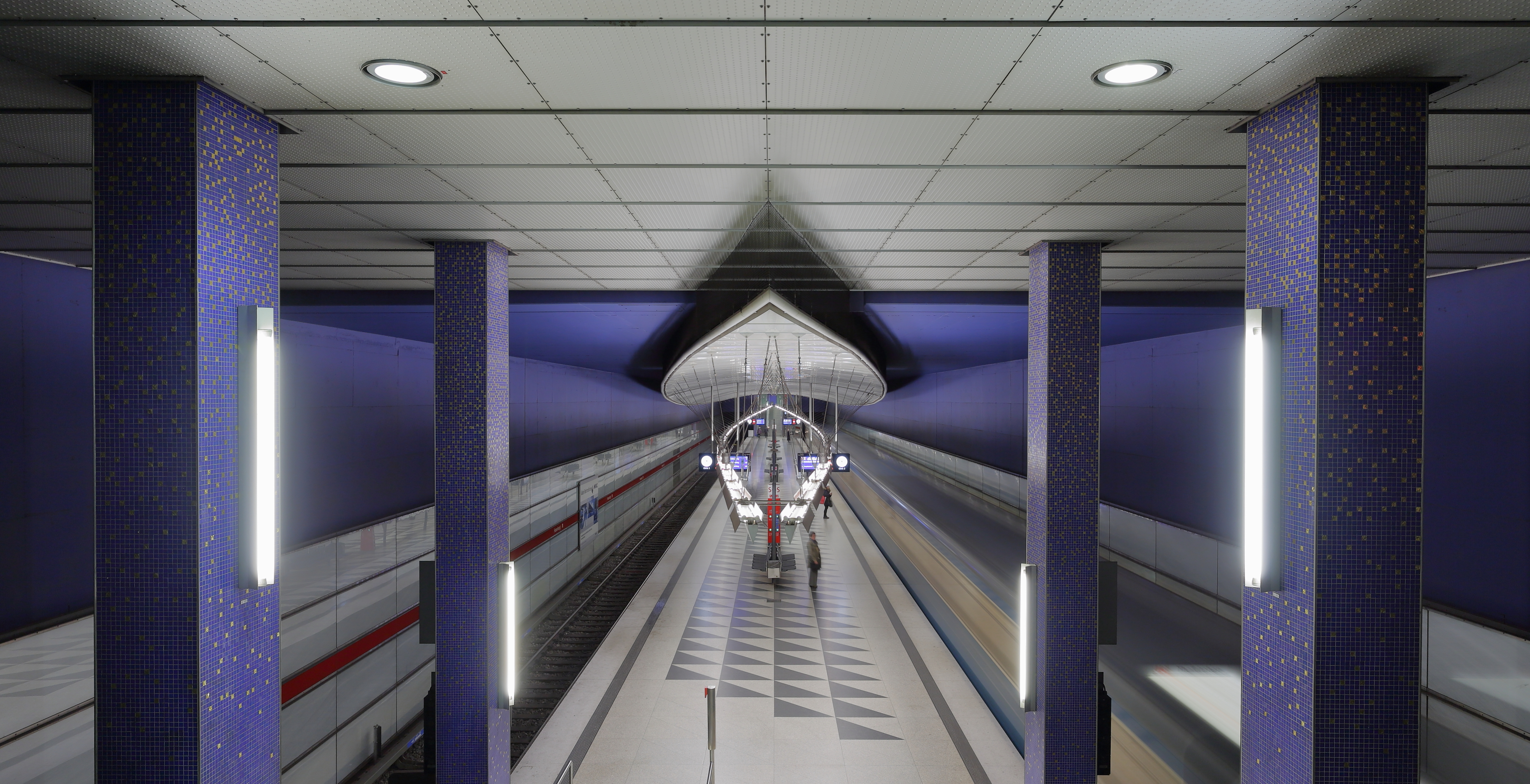
Hasenbergl U-Bahn station

Hasenbergl is an U-Bahn station in Munich on the U2, and was opened on 26 October 1996 (29 years ago). It is the second-to-last station on the U2 and is positioned to the east of the Feldmoching station, the terminus of the U2 line.

Preceding station	Munich U-Bahn	Following station
Feldmoching Terminus	U2	Dülferstraße towards Messestadt Ost
