= Hohenzollernplatz station =

Hohenzollernplatz station may refer to:

- Hohenzollernplatz station (Berlin U-Bahn)
- Hohenzollernplatz station (Munich U-Bahn)
