= Olympiazentrum station =

Station of the Munich U-Bahn

Olympiazentrum

General information
- Location: Milbertshofen; Munich, Germany
- Coordinates: 48°10′46″N 11°33′21″E
- Line: Stammstrecke 1
- Platforms: 2 island platforms
- Tracks: 4
- Connections: Bus

Construction
- Structure type: Underground
- Accessible: Yes

Other information
- Fare zone: : M

History
- Opened: 8 May 1972; 54 years ago

Services
Preceding station	Munich U-Bahn	Following station
Oberwiesenfeld towards Munich-Moosach	U3	Petuelring towards Fürstenried West
Terminus	U8	Petuelring towards Neuperlach Zentrum
Location
- Location within Bavaria Location within Germany Location within Europe

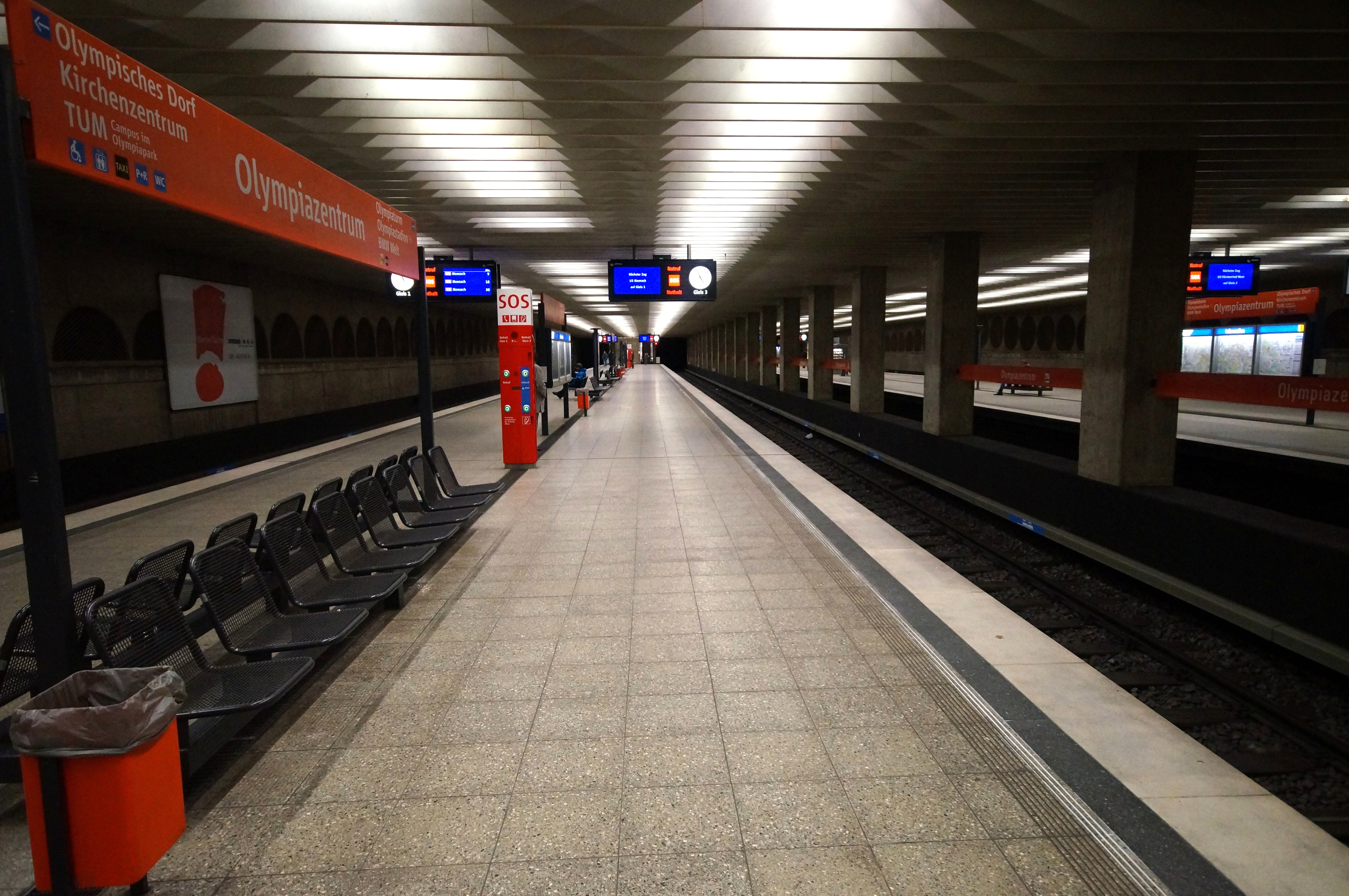
Olympiazentrum station in 2013.

Olympiazentrum is an U-Bahn station in Munich on the U3 of the Munich U-Bahn system. It was opened on 8 May 1972 for the 1972 Summer Olympics and services Munich's Olympiapark and its Olympic Village, and also those who want to visit the BMW Welt museum. Olympiazentrum was initially the terminus of the U3 line prior to 2007.

It was built with four tracks and two island platforms to accommodate the high passenger volume. Today, trains terminating in this station run on the middle tracks, while through trains to or from Moosach U-Bahn station run on the outer tracks. Since December 15, 2013, the supplementary U8 line to Sendlinger Tor has started and ended at the Olympaiazentrum on Saturdays.

The station is located beneath a bus station and parallel to Lerchenauer Straße. The rear track walls are made of concrete with reliefs of circles. The floor of both platforms was laid with an Isar pebble motif, reflecting the light from the skylights on the ceiling, which is clad with aluminum slats. The northern exit leads to the Olympic Village, and the southern exit to both BMW Welt and the Olympic Park. There is an elevator at the northern end of both platforms. Because the station is close to the surface, there are no barrier floors. The station was originally supposed to be called Oberwiesenfeld, which is why, until the U3 line was extended to the Olympia shopping center in 2007, the name Olympiazentrum (Oberwiesenfeld) was twice written on the orange line strip. In 1990, the orange plastic furniture was replaced with wire seats, like those used at the other stations.

Since 2020, the Olympiazentrum subway station, along with four other stations of the Olympia U-Bahn, has been a listed building.

A major scene in the 2019 film Mein Ende. Dein Anfang. was filmed at the Olympiazentrum subway station.

== See also ==
- List of Munich U-Bahn stations
