= Neuperlach Zentrum station =

Station of the Munich U-Bahn

Neuperlach Zentrum
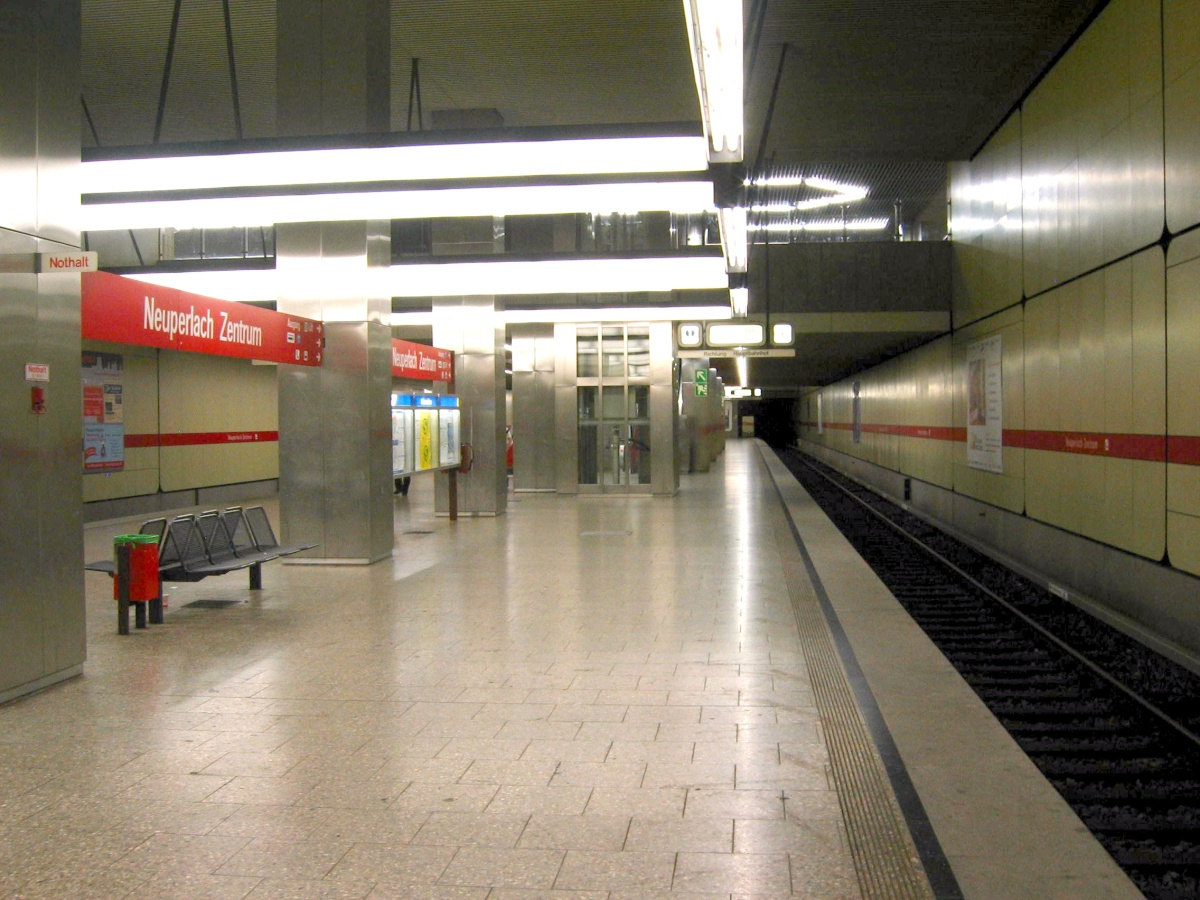

General information
- Location: Neuperlach, Ramersdorf-Perlach; Munich, Germany
- Coordinates: 48°06′03″N 11°38′46″E
- Platforms: Island platform
- Tracks: 2
- Connections: MVV buses

Construction
- Structure type: Underground
- Accessible: Yes

Other information
- Fare zone: : M

Services
Preceding station	Munich U-Bahn	Following station
Quiddestraße towards Laimer Platz	U5	Therese-Giehse-Allee towards Neuperlach Süd
Quiddestraße towards Olympia-Einkaufszentrum	U7	Terminus
Quiddestraße towards Olympiazentrum	U8	Terminus
Location

Neuperlach Zentrum is an U-Bahn station in Munich, Germany, on the U5. Located centrally within the planned Neuperlach district, which was developed in the 1960s as a residential and commercial area. This station serves as a hub, providing access not only to the subway line but also to bus routes, including line N79, linking various parts of the city. The station is part of Zone M, offering ticket vending machines and other facilities.
