= Munich-Feldmoching station =

Munich railway station

München Feldmoching
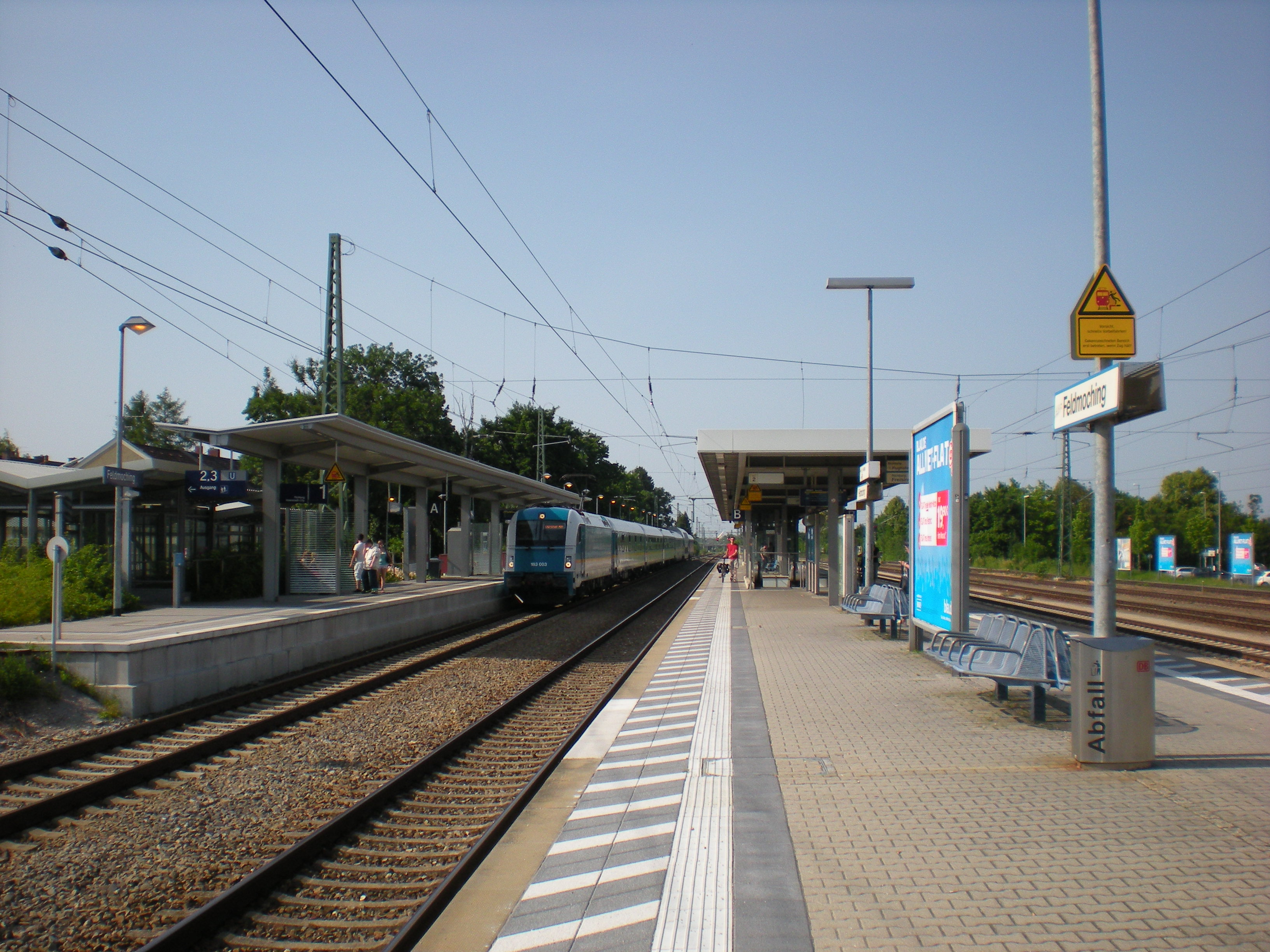
- Feldmoching S-Bahn station

General information
- Location: Josef-Frankl-Str. 1, Munich, Bavaria; Germany
- Coordinates: 48°12′49″N 11°32′29″E
- Lines: Munich–Regensburg (KBS 930); Connecting line to the Munich North Ring
- Platforms: 2 S-Bahn; 2 U-Bahn
- Connections: 170, 171, 172, 173, N41, X206

Construction
- Accessible: Yes

Other information
- Station code: 4253
- DS100 code: MFE
- IBNR: 8004147
- Category: 5
- Fare zone: : M and 1
- Website: www.bahnhof.de; stationsdatenbank.de

History
- Opened: Surface station: 1867; 159 years ago; Underground station: 1996; 30 years ago
- Electrified: 23 April 1926; 100 years ago

Services
Preceding station	DB Regio Bayern	Following station
Moosach towards München Hbf	RB 33	Unterschleißheim towards Landshut Hbf
Preceding station	Munich S-Bahn	Following station
Fasanerie towards Leuchtenbergring	S1	Oberschleißheim towards Freising or Flughafen
Preceding station	Munich U-Bahn	Following station
Terminus	U2	Hasenbergl towards Messestadt Ost
Location

Munich-Feldmoching station is a station in the Feldmoching section of Munich District 24, Feldmoching-Hasenbergl. Three rail lines serve the station, S-Bahn line S1, regional service RB 33 and U-Bahn line U2.

== S-Bahn station ==
Feldmoching station is on the Munich–Regensburg railway. A single track branch connects to the Munich North Ring, leading to the Munich North marshalling yard. This runs directly to the south, while the main line runs to the southwest.

On 3 November 1858, the Royal Bavarian Eastern Railway Company opened the line between Munich and Landshut. A year later, the line was extended to Regensburg. The station was opened (in the then independent municipality) of Feldmoching in 1867. On 3 November 1891 the line was duplicated from Feldmoching to Lohhof. After 28 September 1892, the line south of Moosach was relocated, creating a double-track line to Munich Central Station (German: Hauptbahnhof). On 28 September 1925, Feldmoching station was electrified as part of the section from Munich to Freising. By 10 May 1927, the entire section to Regensburg could be operated with electric locomotives. With the incorporation of Feldmoching into Munich in 1938, the station was renamed on 1 October 1938 to Munich-Feldmoching. In 1944, the station was served every day by 32 local trains, going from Munich to Freising, Landshut and Regensburg. In 1972, the station facilities were rebuilt in preparation for S-Bahn operations. Among other things, the platforms were raised to a height of 76 centimetres. Since 1972, the operation of the trackwork has been remotely controlled by using a Siemens class 59 (SP Dr S59) track plan push button interlocking at Oberschleißheim. Since then the station has been served at 20-minute intervals by S-Bahn line 1 trains and only some regional trains.

At Feldmoching there are three platforms. Platform 1 is used by S-Bahn trains and some Regionalbahn trains, all going towards Munich. Platform 3 accommodates S-Bahn trains to Freising and the Airport and Regionalbahn trains towards Freising and beyond. The platforms are all 210 metres long and 96 cm high. Regional-Express and Alex trains pass through the station without stopping. Platform 2 serves as a holding track for freight trains, which branch off towards the marshalling yard and must cross the city-bound track 3. East of the platform are four tracks used for parking freight trains.

== U-Bahn station ==
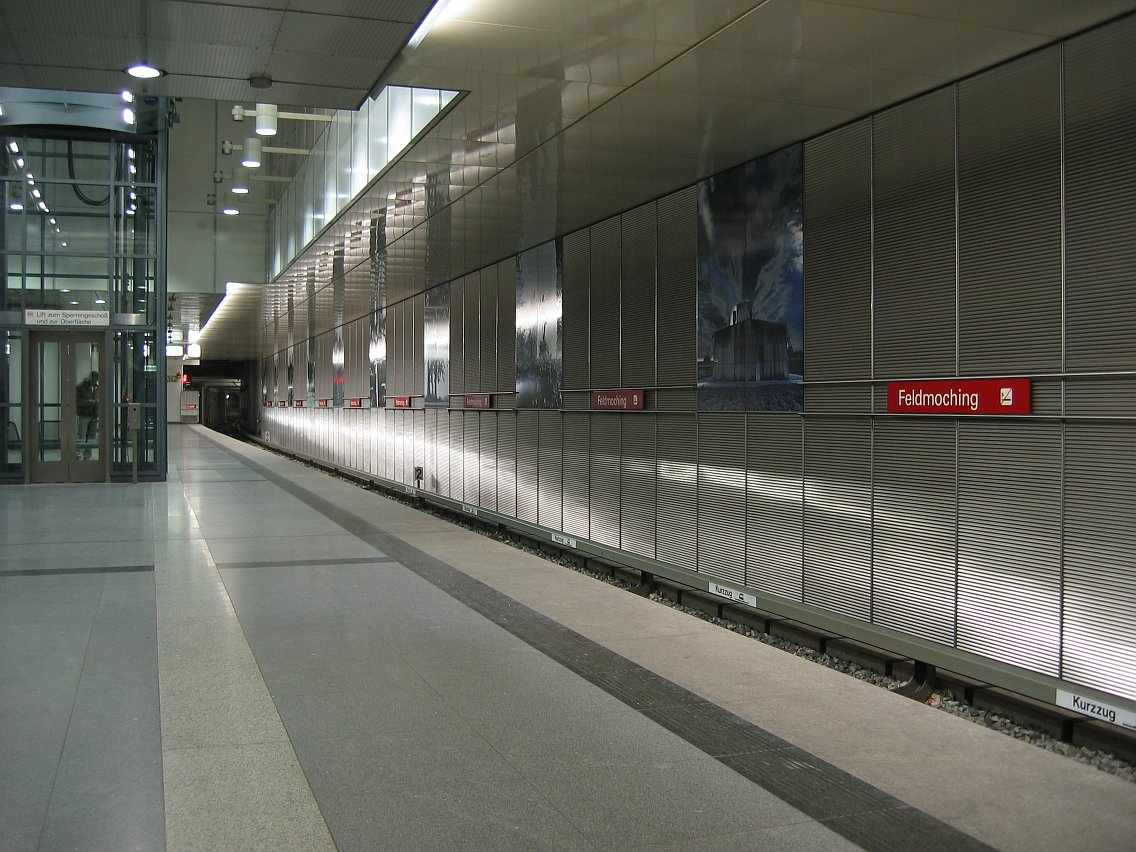
Feldmoching U-Bahn station

The terminus of the U2 line of the Munich U-Bahn is situated in an east-west direction at the station. The station has two tracks on either side of a central platform and an integrated two-track turnback. The station was opened on 26 October 1996. Since late 2009, direct access to both platforms of the S-Bahn station has been possible. Previously, to reach the S-Bahn running towards the city centre, it was necessary to leave the U-Bahn station at its western end and walk a short distance through a shopping area.
