= Trams in Munich =

Tram system in the city of Munich, Germany

Coordinates: 48.1484°N 11.4616°E

Munich tramway

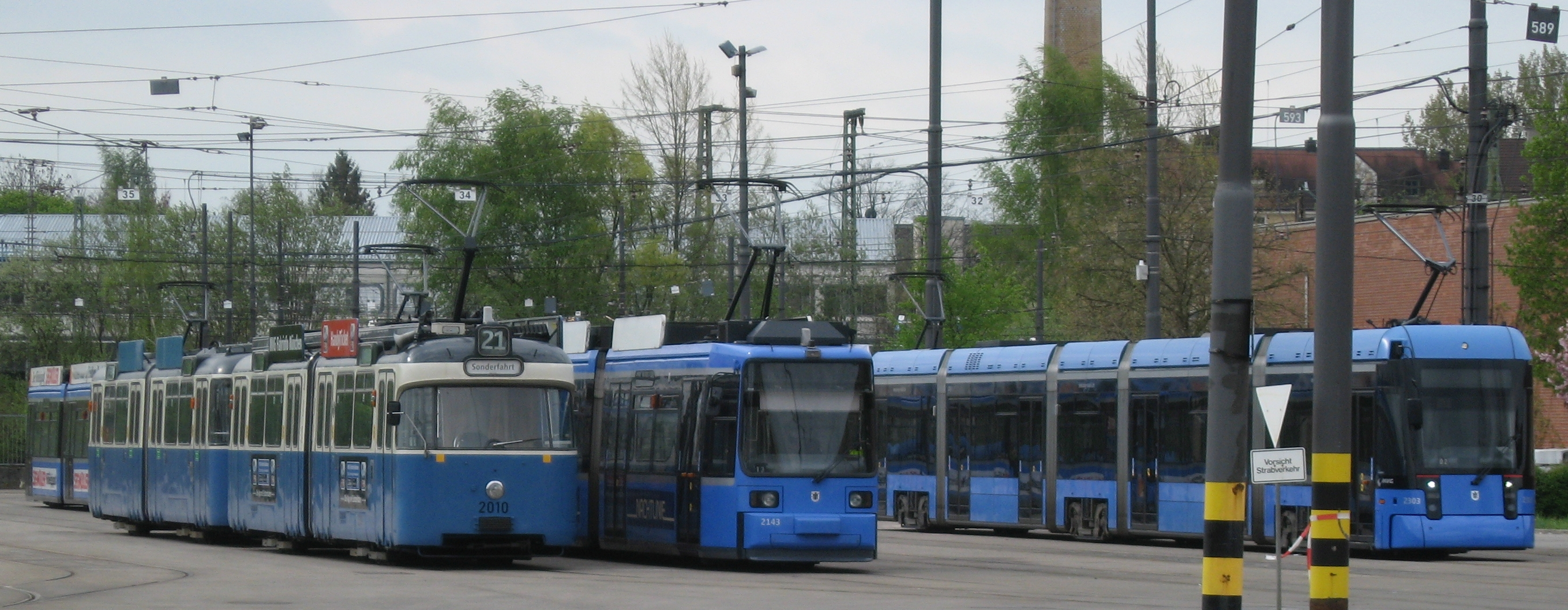
- Class P (left), Class R and Class S tram

Overview
- Locale: Munich, Bavaria, Germany
- Transit type: Tram
- Number of lines: 1952: 21; 1964: 21; 1972: 18 + 3 Olympic special routes 1984: 11; 1996: 9; 2010: 11; 2011: 11; 2012: 13; 2019: 14
- Number of stations: 165
- Daily ridership: 284,900 (2012)
- Annual ridership: 104 million (2012)

Operation
- Began operation: 1876 (horsecar); 1895 (electric trams)
- Operator: Münchner Verkehrsgesellschaft
- Number of vehicles: 106

Technical
- System length: 1952: 120 km (75 mi); 1964: 135 km (84 mi); 1972: 120 km (75 mi); 1984: 83 km (52 mi); 1996: 68 km (42 mi); 2010: 75 km (47 mi); 2011: 80 km (50 mi) from 2016: 83 km (52 mi)
- Track gauge: 1,435 mm (4 ft 8 1/2 in)
- Electrification: 750 Volts
- Average speed: 19.3 km/h (12.0 mph)

The Munich tramway (German: Straßenbahn München) is the tramway network for the city of Munich in Germany. Today it is operated by the municipally owned Münchner Verkehrsgesellschaft (the Munich Transport Company, or MVG) and is known officially and colloquially as the Tram. Previous operators have included Société Anonyme des Tramways de Munich, the Münchner Trambahn-Aktiengesellschaft, the Städtische Straßenbahnen and the Straßenbahn München.

The tram network interconnects with the MVG's bus network, the Munich U-Bahn and the Munich S-Bahn, all of which use a common tariff as part of the Münchner Verkehrs- und Tarifverbund (Munich Transport and Tariff Association, or MVV) transit area.

As of 2012, the daytime tram network comprises 13 lines and is 79 kilometres (49 mi) long with 165 stops. There is also a night tram service with four routes. The network is operated by 106 trams (as of 2012), and transported 98 million people in 2010 and 104 million people in 2012.

== History ==
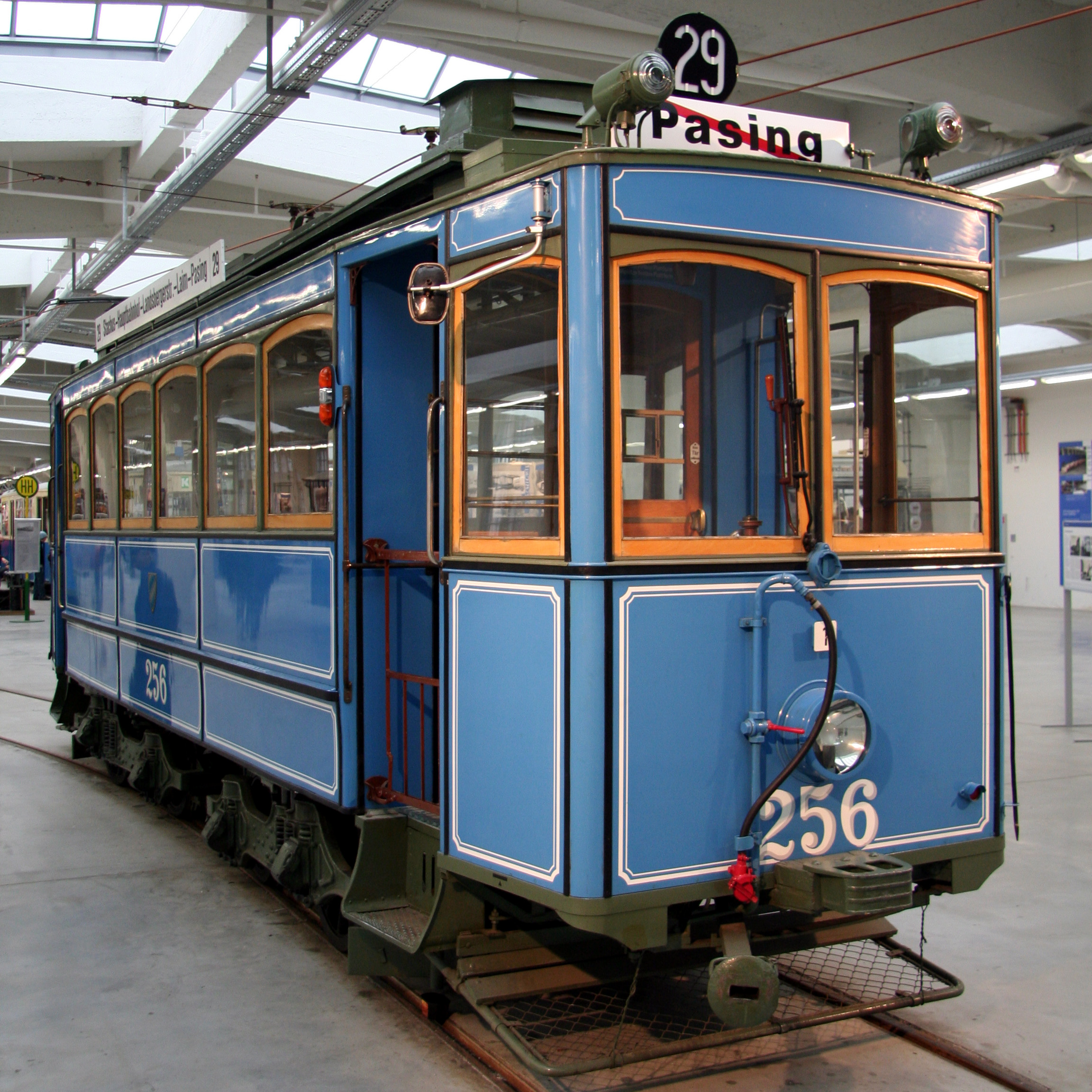
A type A2.2 tram from 1901 in the MVG museum

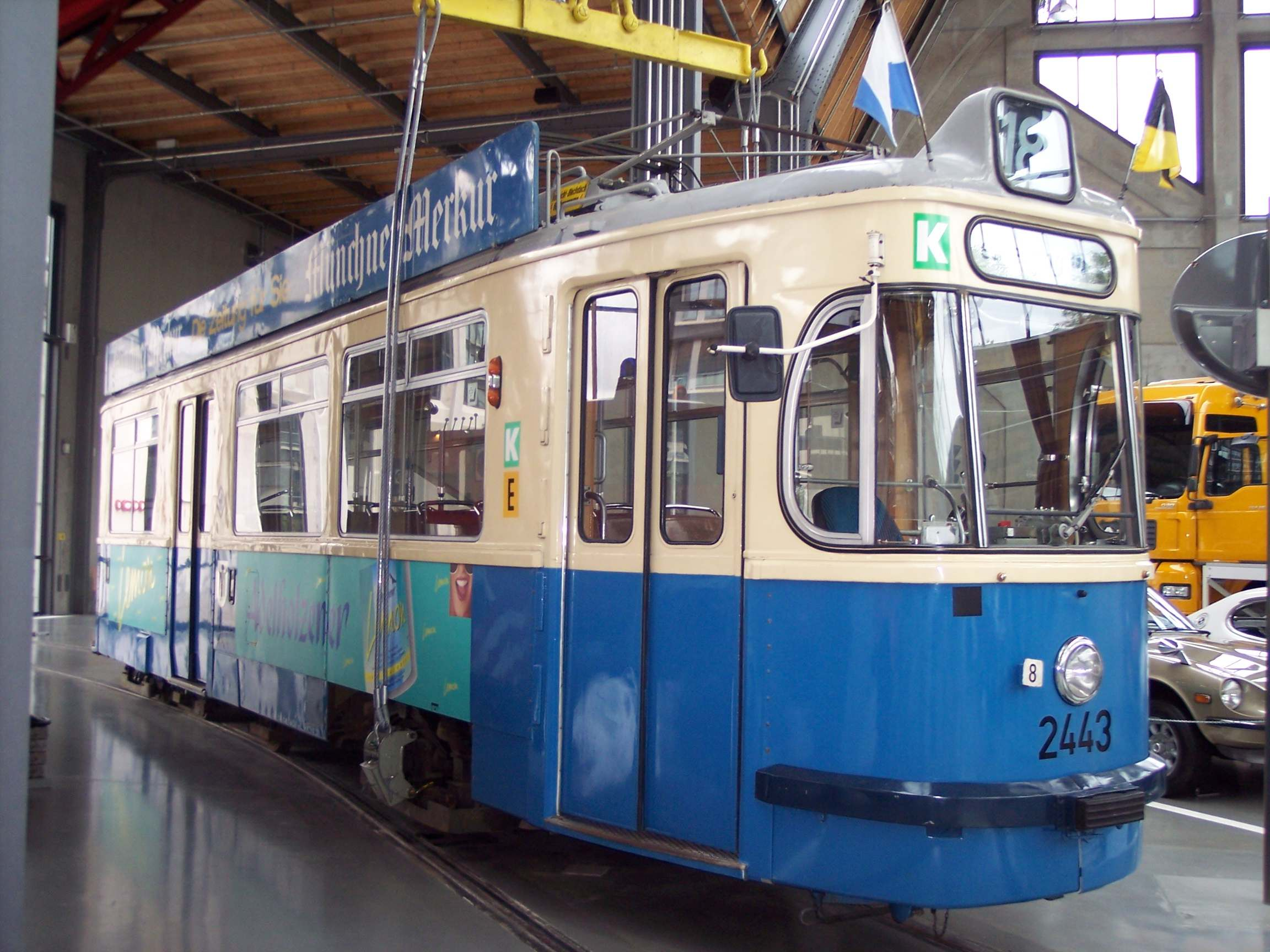
A type M4.65 tram from the 1950s in the Deutsches Museum

The tramway started in 1876, with a horsecar service. The first tramways extended from Karlsplatz (Stachus), which remains one of central nodes of Munich's tram network. Two years later, the Société Anonyme des Tramways de Munich was founded. In 1882, the Münchner Trambahn-Aktiengesellschaft (MTAG) was founded.

Electric trams were introduced by Union-Elektricitäts-Gesellschaft in 1895. In 1900, the last horsecar was taken out of service. In 1907, MTAG was taken over by the city, and changed its name to Städtische Straßenbahnen. In 1919, the municipal agency Münchner Straßenbahnen was established. After World War II ended in 1945, only twenty tram lines remained; of 444 trams, only 168 were in operational condition. In 1956, the first new tram line after the war was opened.

The 1972 Munich Olympic Games presaged a major expansion of public transport in the city. In 1965, construction of the Munich U-Bahn, the city's rapid transit system, was started. It opened in 1971, the same year as the transit authority MVV was founded. In 1972 a new S-Bahn network opened that, like the U-Bahn, was carried in new tunnels under the city centre. As these networks grew, they seemed to threaten the tram network, with extensive line closures in favour of the new modes.

Such closures continued into the 1990s, but in 1991 the city council passed a plan to upgrade and modernize the tramway, as the trams were seen to be a better fit to expected passenger flows on many routes. Three years later, Class R2 low-floor trams were introduced, along with a night network. These were followed, in 1999, by the larger Class R3 trams. In 2001, the voltage on which the trams operate was increased from 600 to 750 V. The following year the MVG was formed.

In 2009 the brand new route 23 was opened. This route acts as a feeder route for U-Bahn lines U3 and U6, to which it connects in an elaborate terminus above Münchner Freiheit U-Bahn station. The line has no interchanges with other tram routes, but is linked to the rest of the tram network by a connecting track that has carried no public service until 2025, when route 12 was prolonged. At the same time, February 2009, class S trams, built to the Stadler Variobahn design, were introduced.

In December 2011 an extension was opened from the previous Effnerplatz terminus to St. Emmeram. The extension was 4.3 kilometres (2.7 mi) long and added seven new tram stops to the network. Tram route 16 was extended to serve St. Emmeram, with knock-on effects on routes 17, 18 and 27.

In December 2012 new routes 22 and 28 were opened.

In December 2013, the extension of route 19, from its previous terminus at Pasing-Marienplatz to München-Pasing railway station, was opened in order to enable better interchange with S-Bahn and long-distance train services.

In December 2016, route 25 was extended to the east of the city, from Max Weber Platz to Berg am Laim S-Bahn station. The extension comprises 2.8 kilometres (1.7 mi) of segregated alignment with seven new stops, and a journey time of approximately eight minutes. The area served is undergoing redevelopment.

In January 2025, route 12 was extended from Scheidplatz to Schwabing Nord, along the route of Line 23 that has been a connecting track previously.

On February 28, 2026, the first section of a new tangential line, known as the Tram-Westtangente (English: Western Tangential Tram) opened between the existing Fürstenrieder Straße and Ammerseestraße stops. The 1.5 km (0.93 mi) long new section has two intermediate stations, Aindorferstraße and Laimer Platz (where there is an interchange with U-Bahn line 5), and together with its opening introduced the new line 14.

== Operation ==
=== Vehicles ===
The tram system uses five types of tram:

- The Class P tram is a two-section high-floor articulated tram carried on two four-wheeled trucks, usually operating with a similar articulated trailer tram. They were built by Rathgeber between 1967 and 1969. One two-car set carries 315 passengers, with 151 seated. As of 2011, six sets remained in service, of which two are reserved for special services. The Class P tram was withdrawn in November 2014 for a short time.
- The Class R2 tram is a three-section 100% low-floor articulated tram carried on six axles. The trams were built by Adtranz to their GT6N design between 1994 and 1997. Each tram has a capacity of 157 passengers, of whom 58 are seated. As of 2011, 68 trams are in service, operating on all lines.
- The Class R3 tram is a four-section 100% low-floor articulated tram carried on eight axles. The trams were built by Adtranz to their GT8N2 design between 1999 and 2001. Each tram has a capacity of 218 passengers, of whom 67 are seated. As of 2011, 20 trams are in service, operating on lines 17, 19, 20, 21, 27, and also 25 on school holidays and weekend.
- The Class S tram is a five-section 100% low-floor articulated tram carried on six axles. The trams were built by Stadler to their Variobahn design. They have a capacity of 221 passengers, of whom 75 are seated. Four trams of this design were delivered in 2011, and a further 10 are on order, with delivery expected in 2011.
- The Class T trams are 100% low-floor articulated trams with two-, three- or four sections. They were built by Siemens to their Avenio design. The first tram was delivered to Munich in November 2012. The first Avenios entered service on 17 September 2014 on line 19.

A number of older trams are still owned by the MVG. Some are exhibited in the MVG Museum, and may occasionally be seen on special services. Other Munich trams are displayed in the 'Verkehrszentrum' (Transport Centre) of the Deutsches Museum in Munich.

==== Class M ====
The Class M cars had an unusual configuration, with three axles. The first four M1.62 trams and two m1.62 trailers were delivered by Rathgeber and Westwaggon in 1949 and 1950. Based on the experience with the M1.62, eight M2.63 trams were delivered from 1951 to 1953. These trams had a different door arrangement than the predecessor model. Additionally, eight m2.65 trailers were delivered by Rathgeber and Westwaggon in 1951 and 1952. From 1953 to 1955, 100 type M3.64 trams were built by Rathgeber. From 1956 to 1959, 98 more M4.65 trams were delivered, and from 1963 to 1965, 75 M5.65 trams were delivered. The M tram fleet also had a total of 191 m3 and m4 trailers. In 1975, the entire type M2 fleet was withdrawn due to the reduction of the tram network. After they began to be withdrawn from service, in the 1990s, many were sold to the Bucharest tram system, where they were rebuilt to four-axle configuration. The last day of regular service with type M trams in Munich was 7 December 1998. Several remained in the fleet for a few more years, for special service or as work trams. In 2006, six type M motor trams and four trailers were sold to the tram system in Craiova, Romania, where – unlike the cars sold earlier to Bucharest – they retained their unusual three-axle configuration.

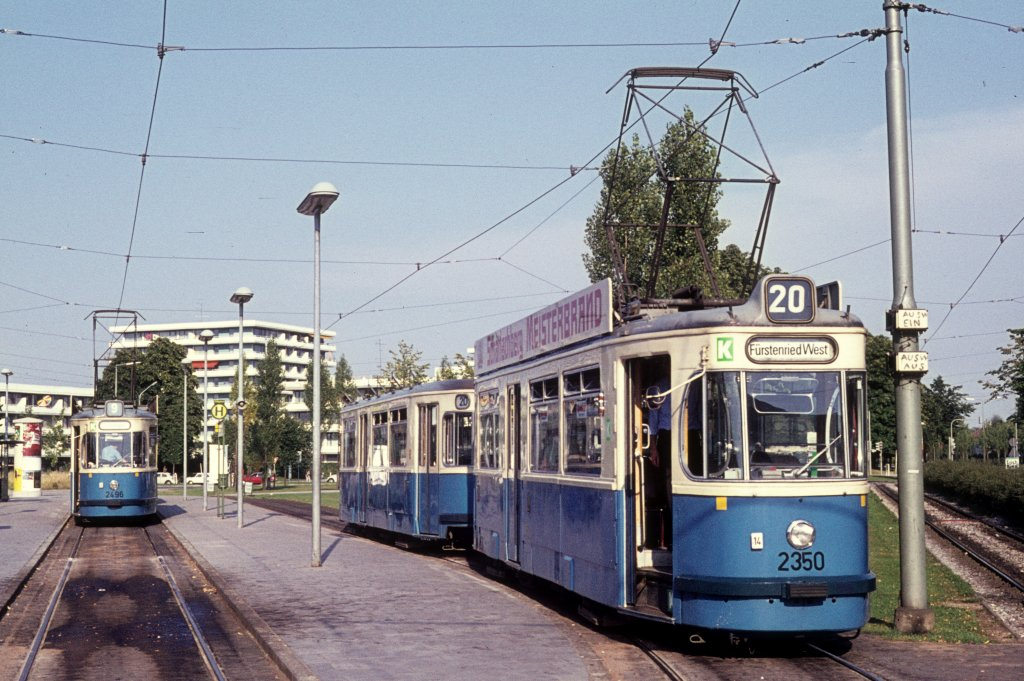
Two Class M trams in August 1974

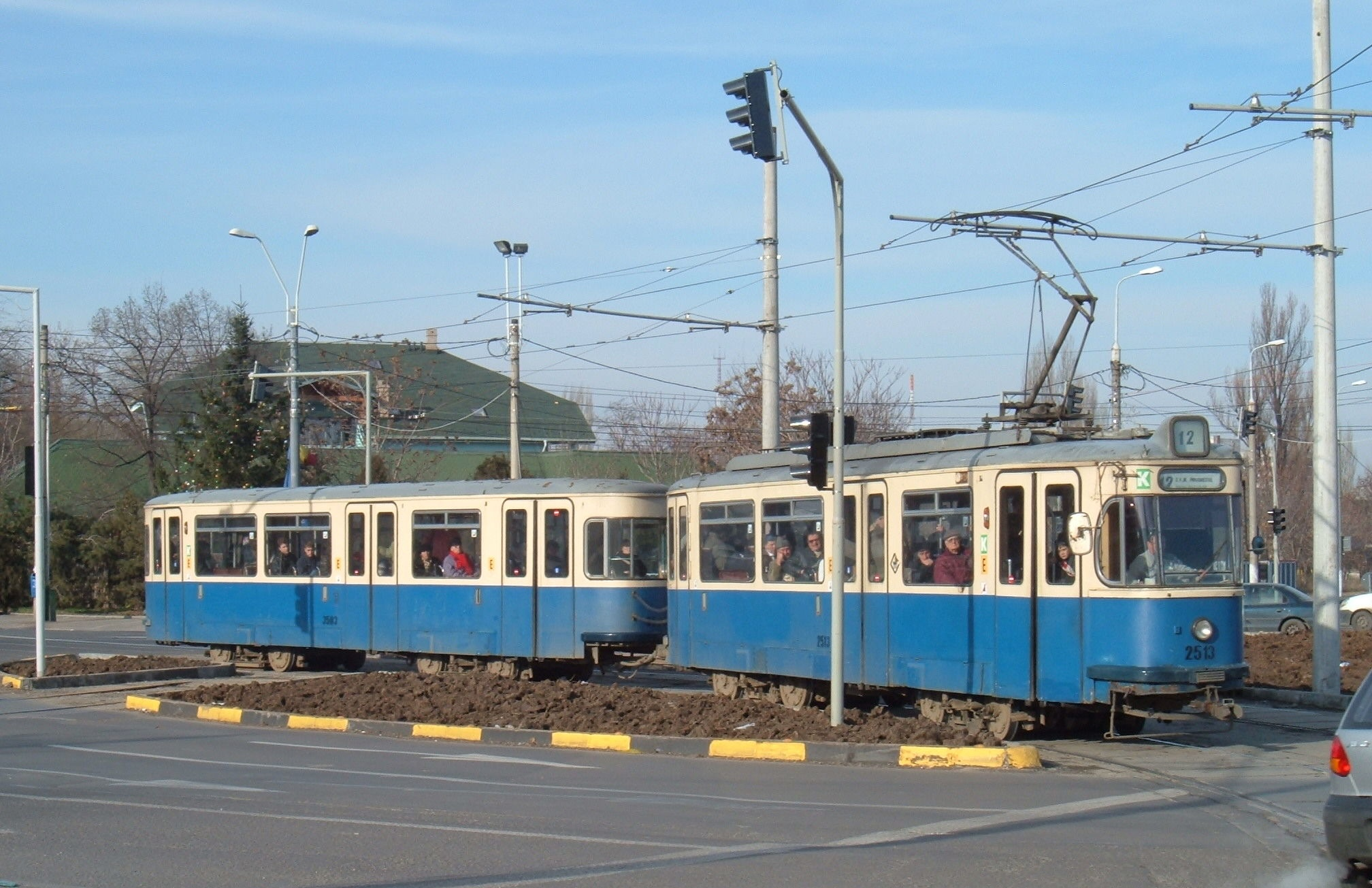
M5.65 and m4 trailer in Bucharest, rebuilt from three-axle configuration to four-axle (with two bogies)

==== Class P ====
Two experimental articulated trams, designated as P1.65, were built by Rathgeber in 1959 and 1960. Since two conductors were required for them, the P1.65 were too uneconomical and no further sets were ordered. In 1965, two prototype articulated trams were delivered by Rathgeber, built under license from Hansa Waggonbau of Bremen. They were designated as P2.12 and P2.13. After the prototypes proved successful, between 1966 and 1968 a total of 42 P3.16 trams were built. A total of 40 p2.14, p2.15 and p3.17 trailers were built by Rathgeber between 1964 and 1968. The type P2 trams were decommissioned in 1982 (motored cars) and 1989 (trailers). Since the 1990s, after delivery of the successor type R3.3, the P3 trains are retired. Between 2001 and 2003, many cars were sold to Romania for use on the Timişoara tram system and the Bucharest tram system. Other trains were scrapped or given to private interested parties. After temporarily only one car had been used in regular service, six P3.16 cars and five trailers were in regular use again in mid-2014. One motor-car was preserved as an inoperable exhibit at the MVG Museum. It was disassembled as a spare parts donor in early 2016.

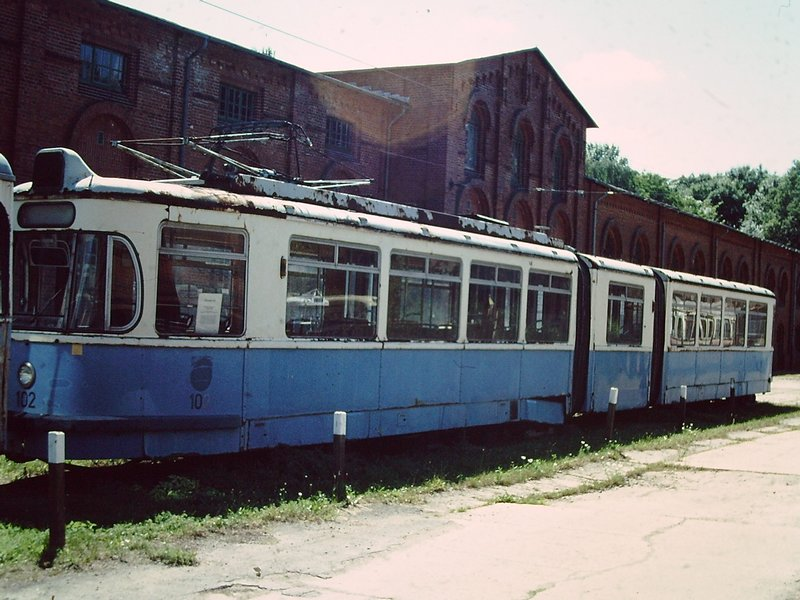
P1.65 at the Hanover tramway museum in 1996

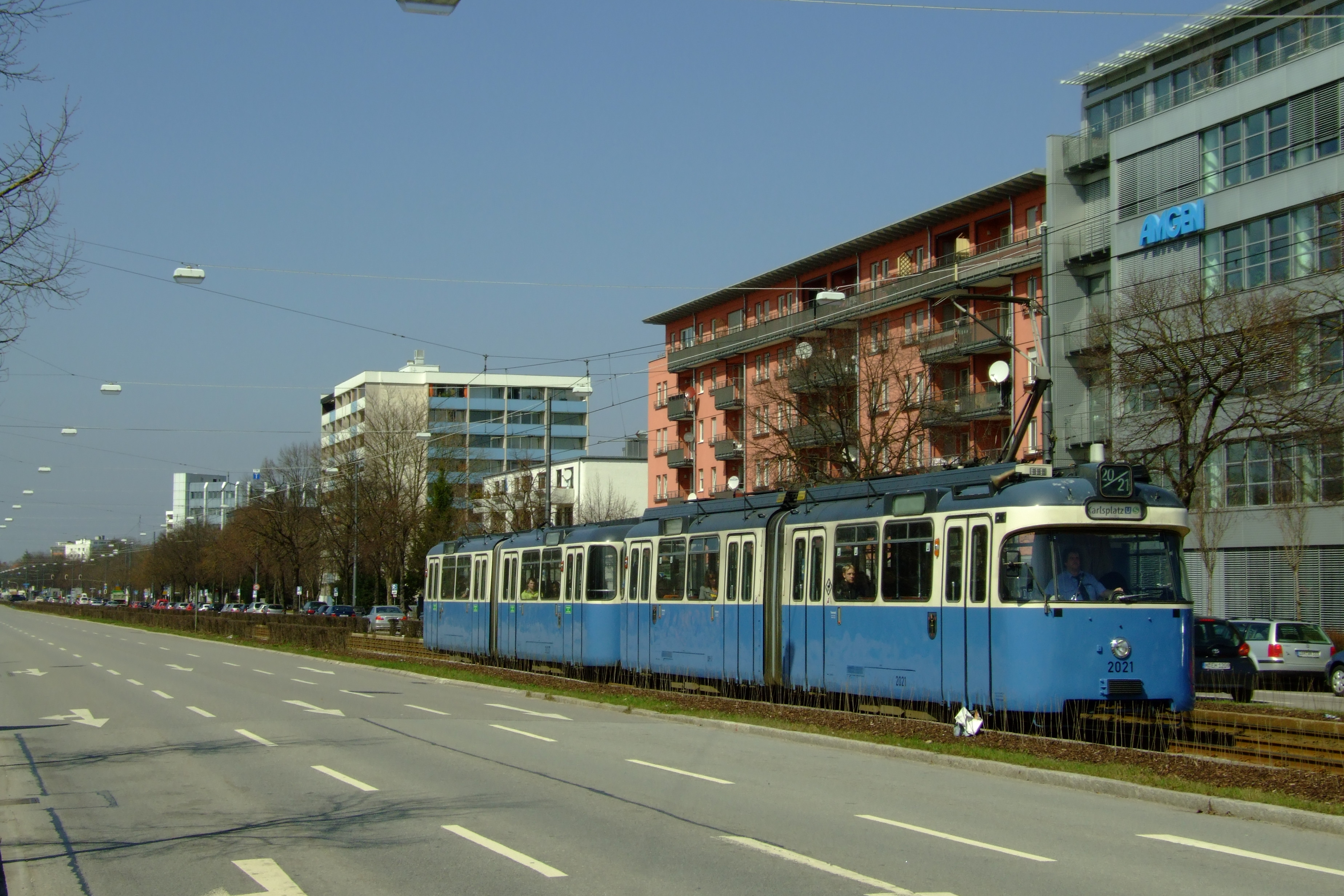
P3.16 in Munich

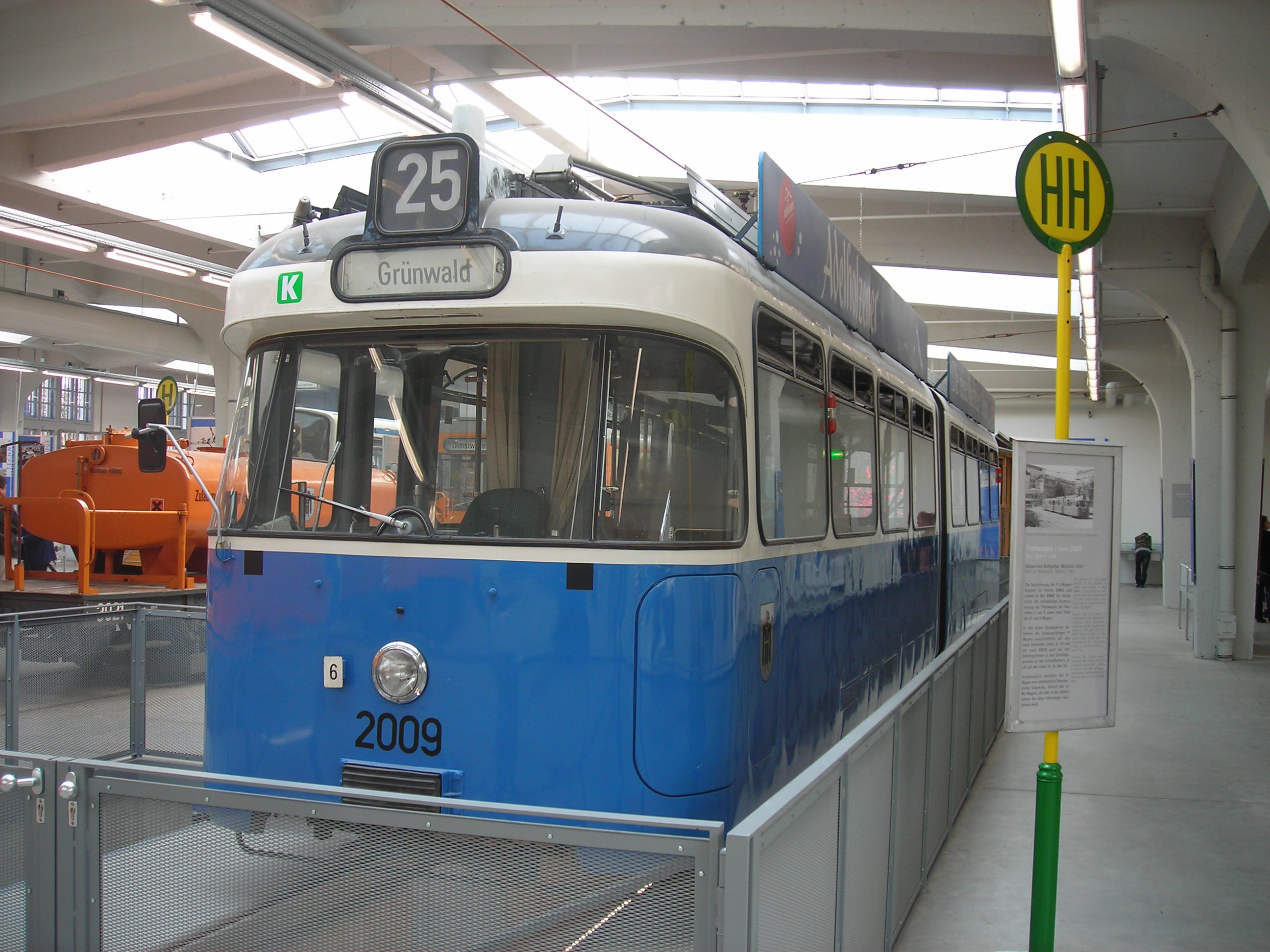
2009 at the MVG Museum in March 2012

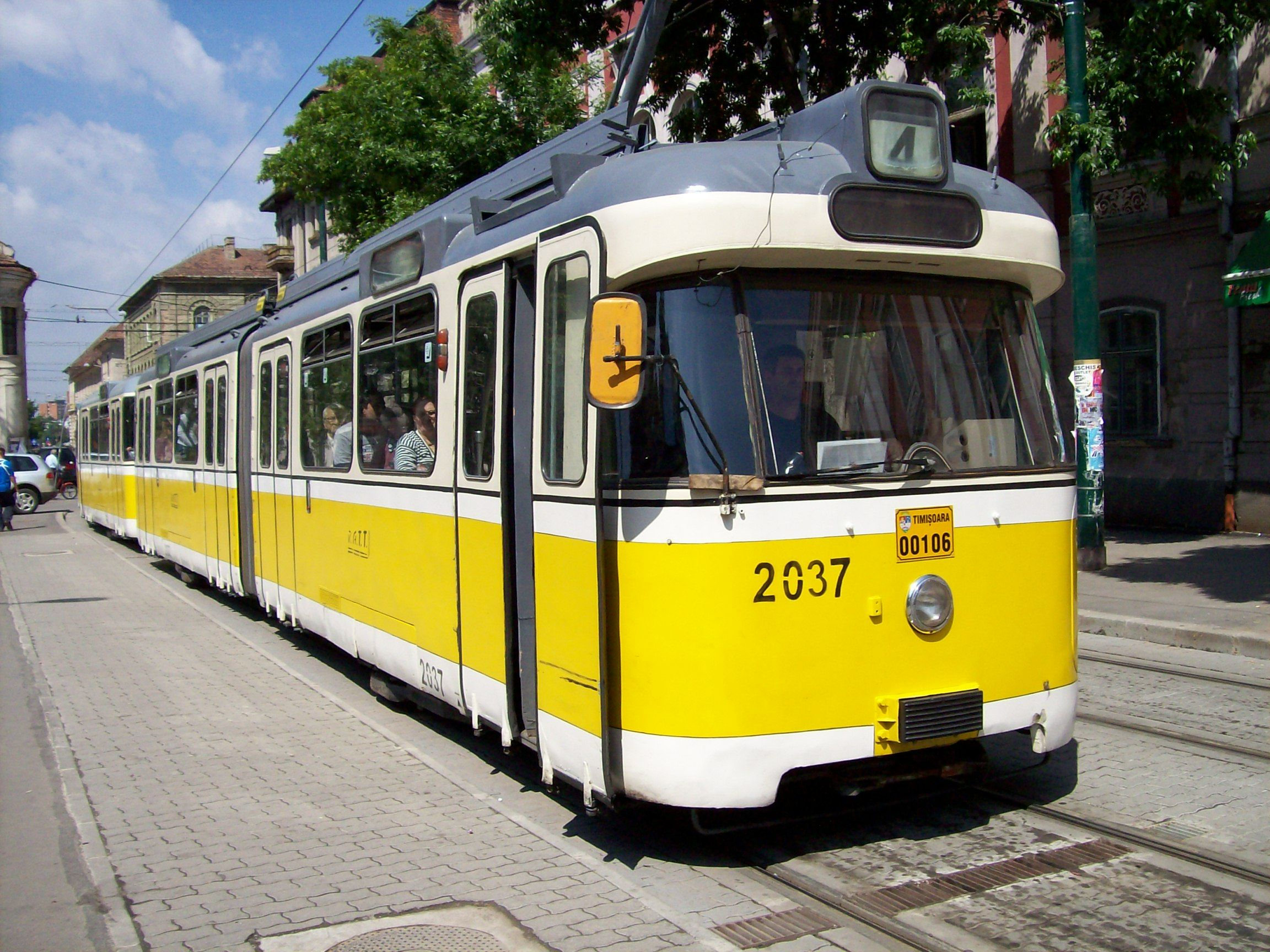
Class P tram in Timișoara in 2007

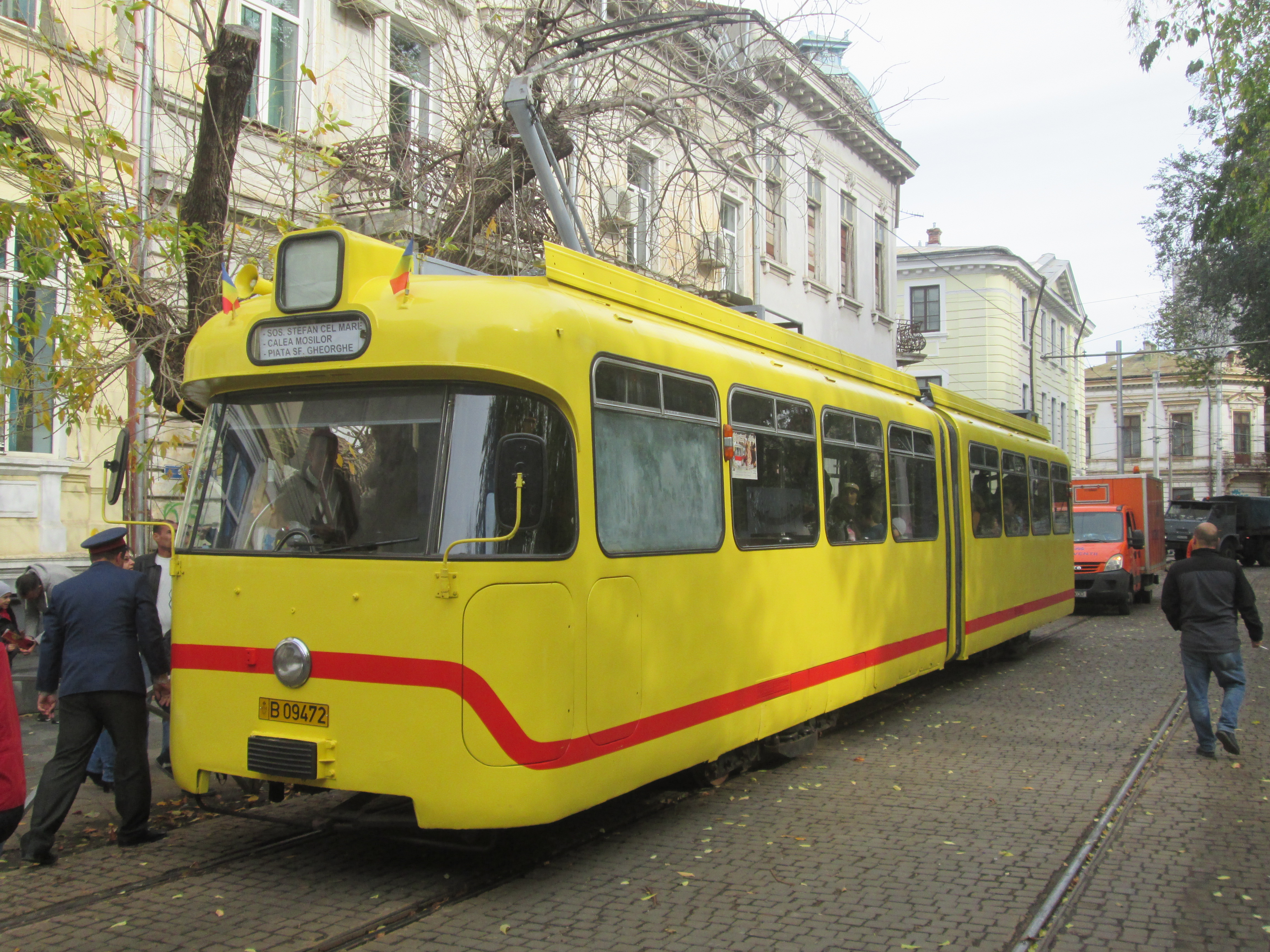
P3.16 in Bucharest in October 2017

==== Class R ====
Three prototypes of a three-section low-floor tram of the Adtranz low floor design were ordered for evaluation. The three cars were delivered 1990/91 and formed the R1.1. series. The cars had two joints and three self-supporting steel car bodies. The three R1.1 cars are no longer part of MVG's fleet since they were returned to the manufacturer. Between 1994 and 1997, a total of 70 three-section low-floor trams were procured, designated as R2.2 series. Towards the end of the 1990s, additional low-floor vehicles with a higher capacity than the R2.2 series were purchased. 20 R3.3 series trams were delivered between 1999 and 2001. Although the R3.3 is based directly on the R2.2, it features a different front design and more doors. Since 2010, around 50 R2.2 trains have been refurbished by a subsidiary of Leipziger Verkehrsbetriebe.

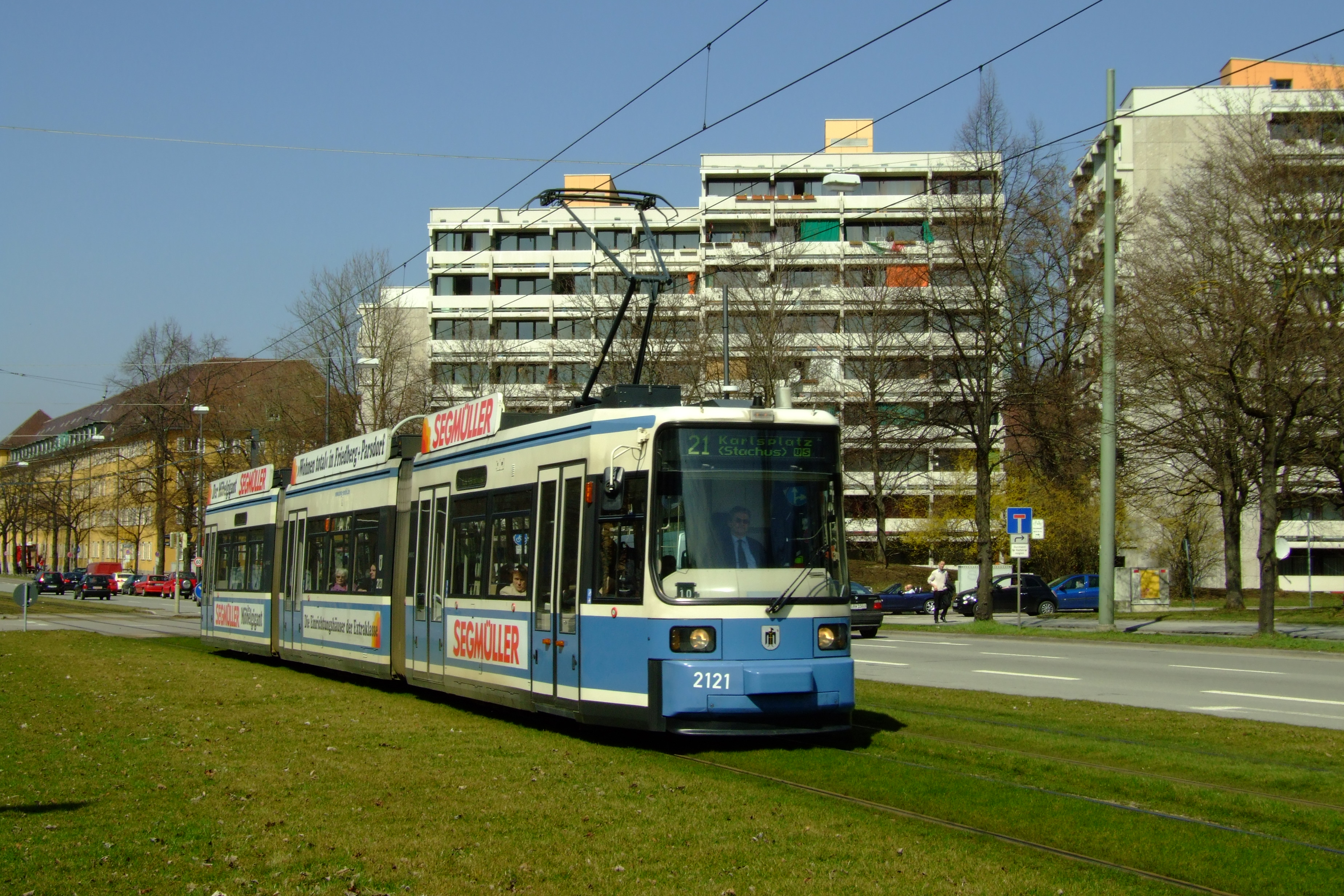
Unrefurbished R2.2 tram in April 2009

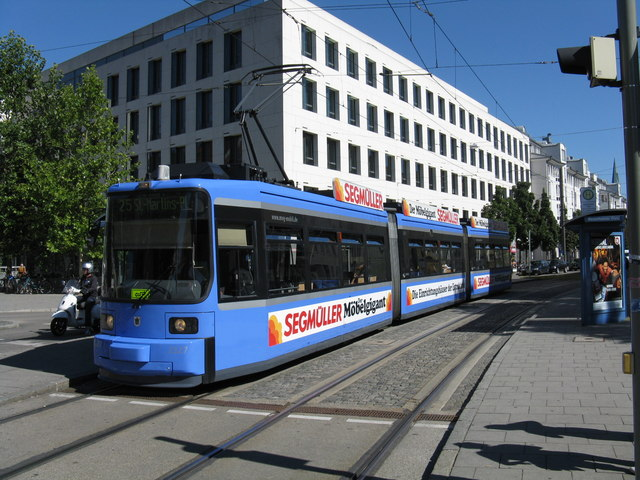
Refurbished R2.2b in August 2012

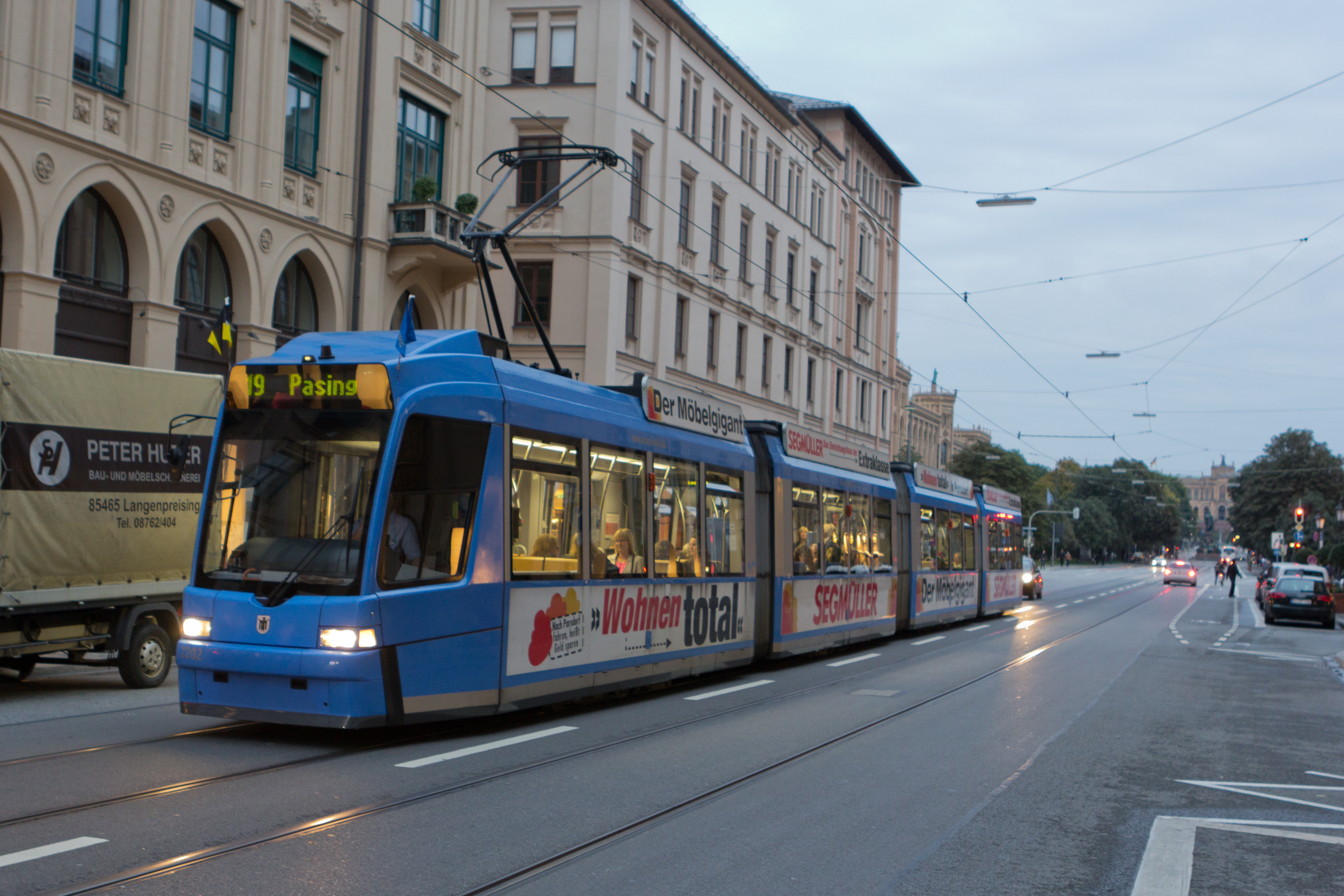
R3.3 in September 2012

==== Class S ====
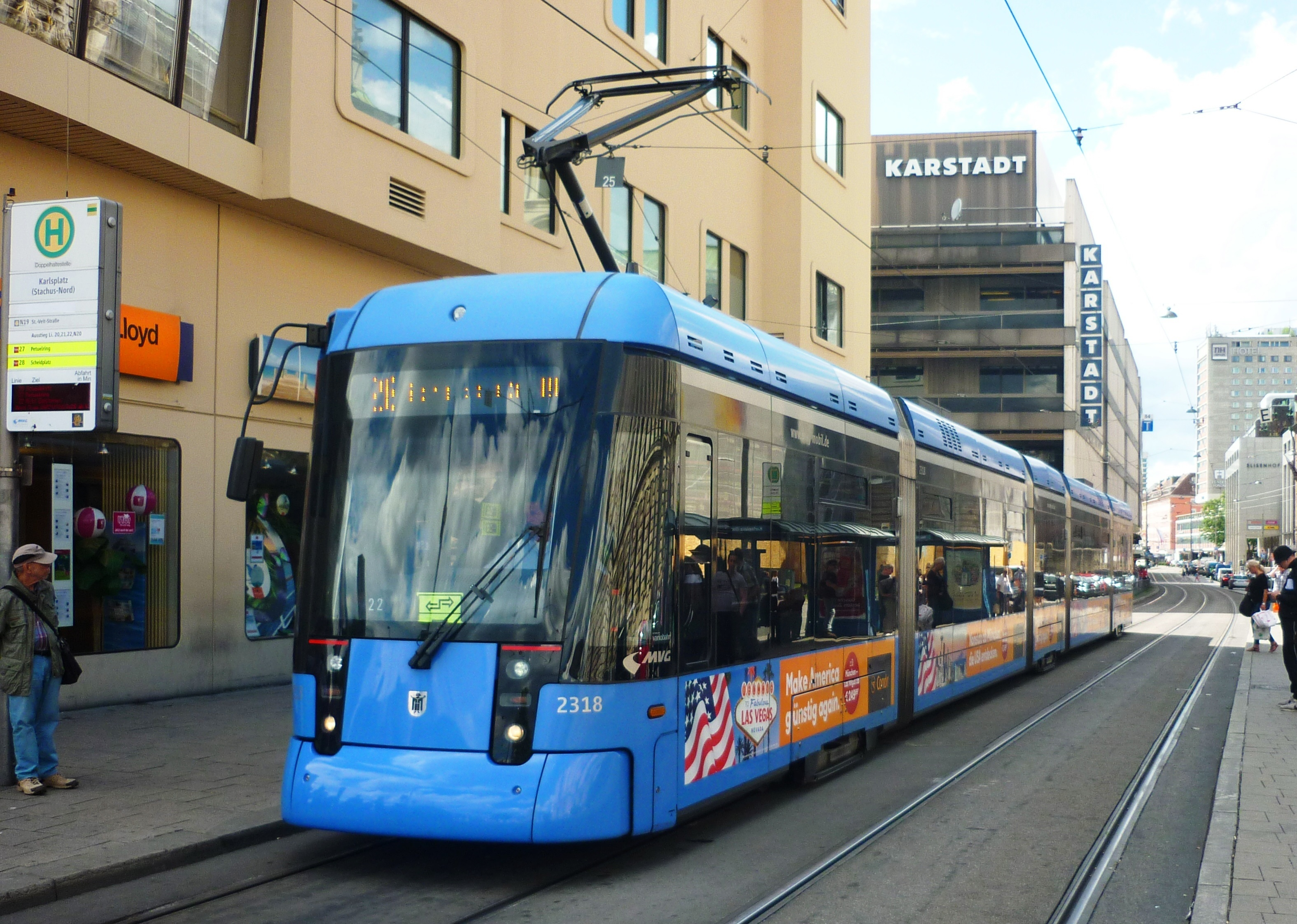
Class S tram in June 2017

The Class S tram is an articulated tram built by Stadler Rail to its Variobahn design. The five-section 100% low-floor trams have a total length of 33.94 metres (111 ft 4 in). The first delivered S-Tram, number 2301, was used for the first time in Munich on 19 March 2009 for a press tour.

A total of 14 trams were built between 2008 and 2011. The vehicles are designed for 221 passengers each. The top speed is 60 km/h (37 mph). After numerous technical problems with its running gears, MVG cancelled the further order and switched to Siemens Avenio for their next generation tram, the T1 tram.

==== Class T ====
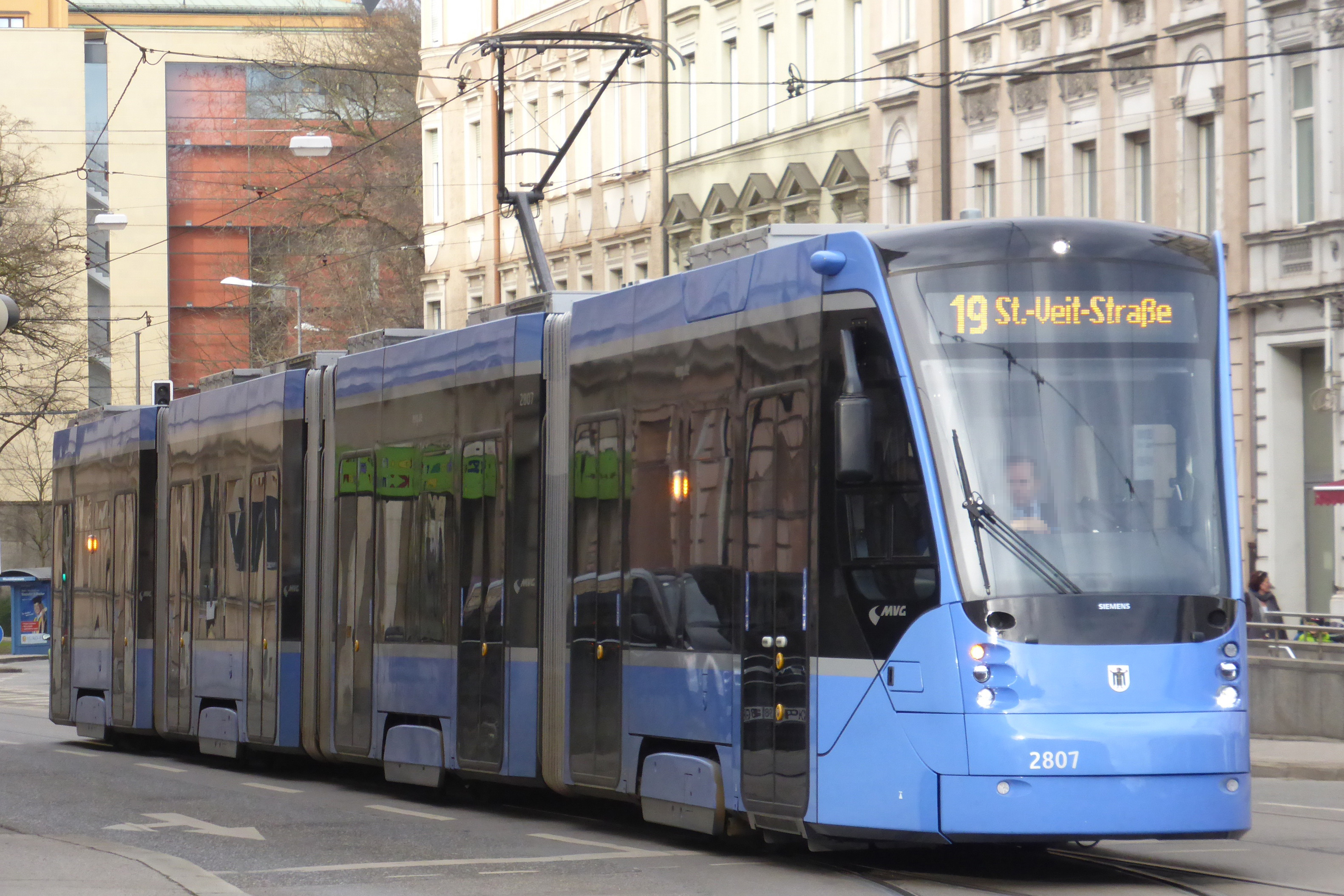
Avenio in Munich

On 28 September 2012, Münchner Verkehrsgesellschaft (MVG) of Munich, Germany, announced an order of 8 Avenio trams for the city's tramway system. They are 36 m (118 ft 1 in) long, 2.3 m (7 ft 7 in) wide and have 4 modules. The contract was worth approx. 29 million Euros and it is understood that this allows six units to be built ahead of the Den Haag trams. Due to bad management and ongoing problems with the Stadler Variobahns, the Avenios were necessary to deliver the advertised service improvements in the new timetable effective December 2013. They were supposed to be fully operational in little more than a year, however the first entered service on 17 September 2014 on Route 19. 22 additional Avenios were ordered in September 2015, followed by another order for 73 more in July 2019.

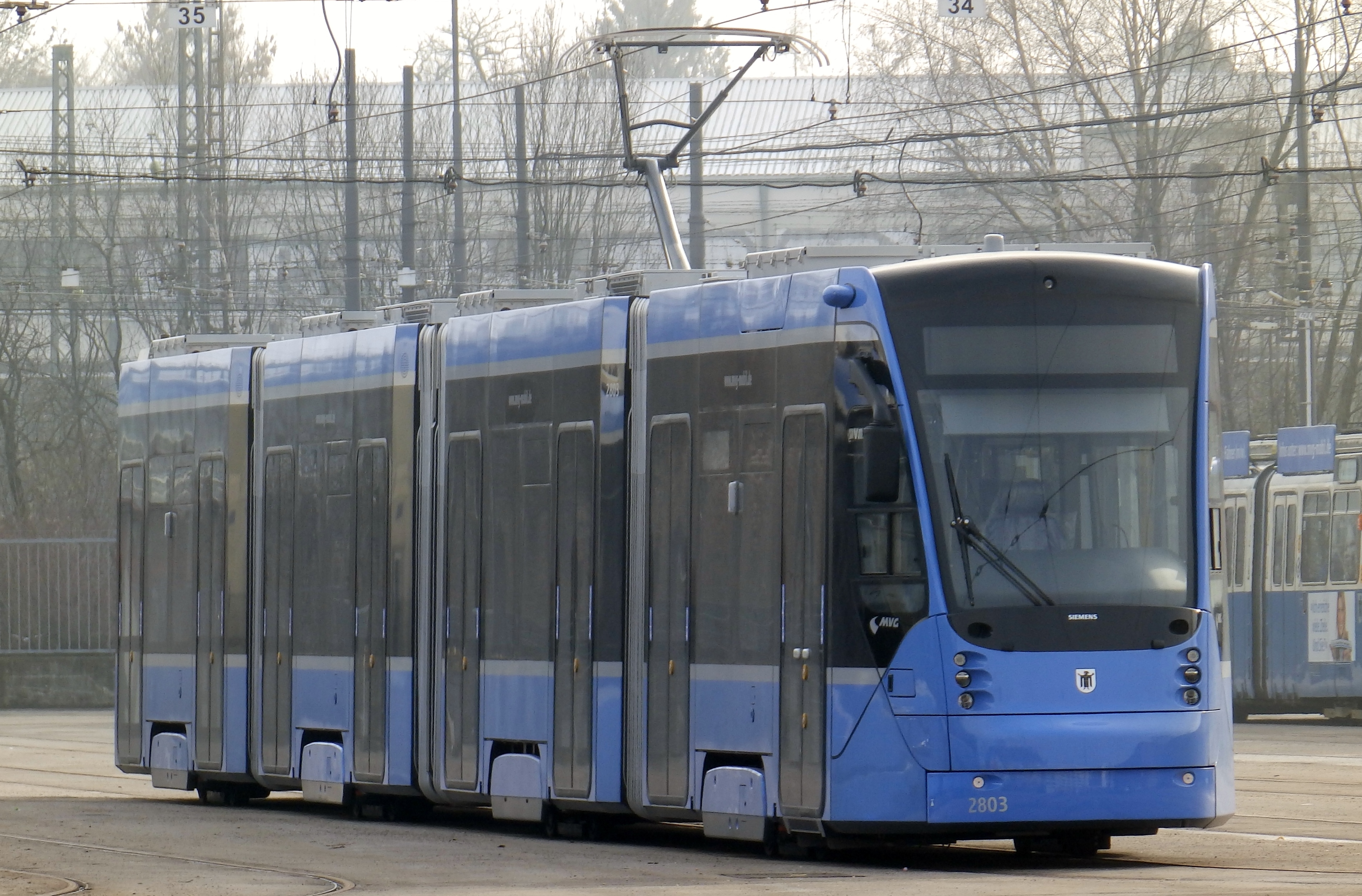
First-generation Avenio

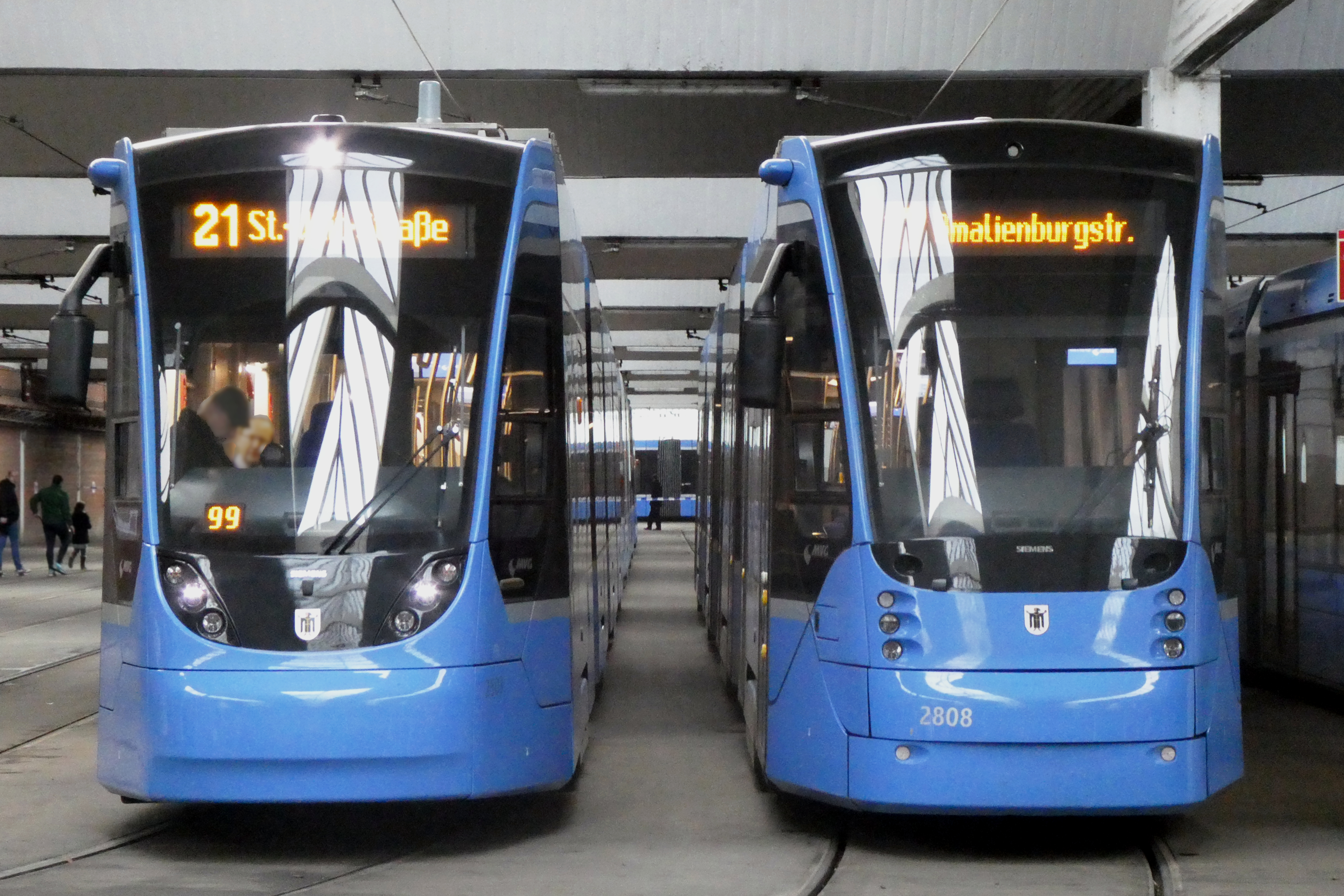
Differences in front design (left: second-generation Avenio)

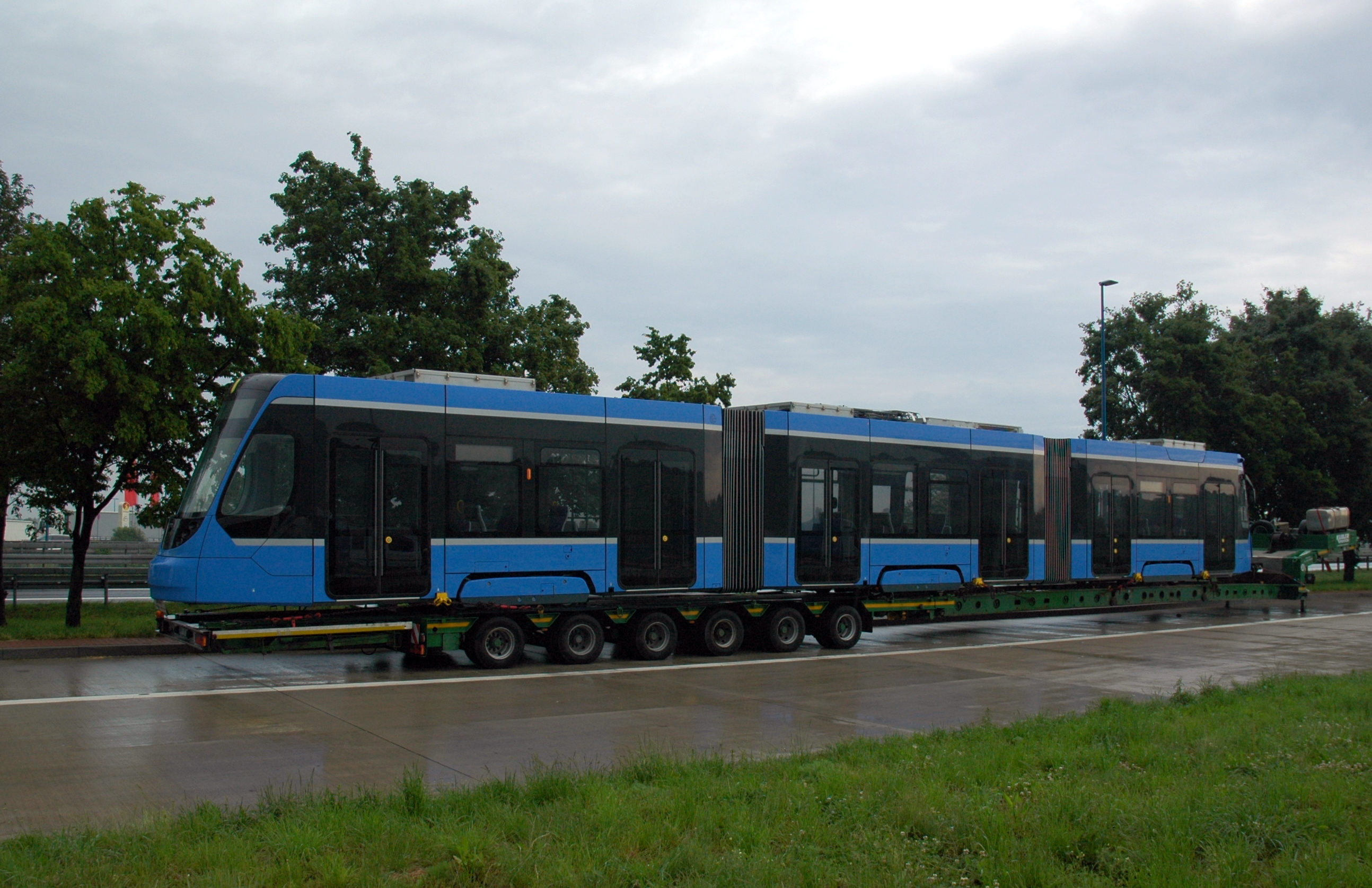
Three-section Avenio on delivery

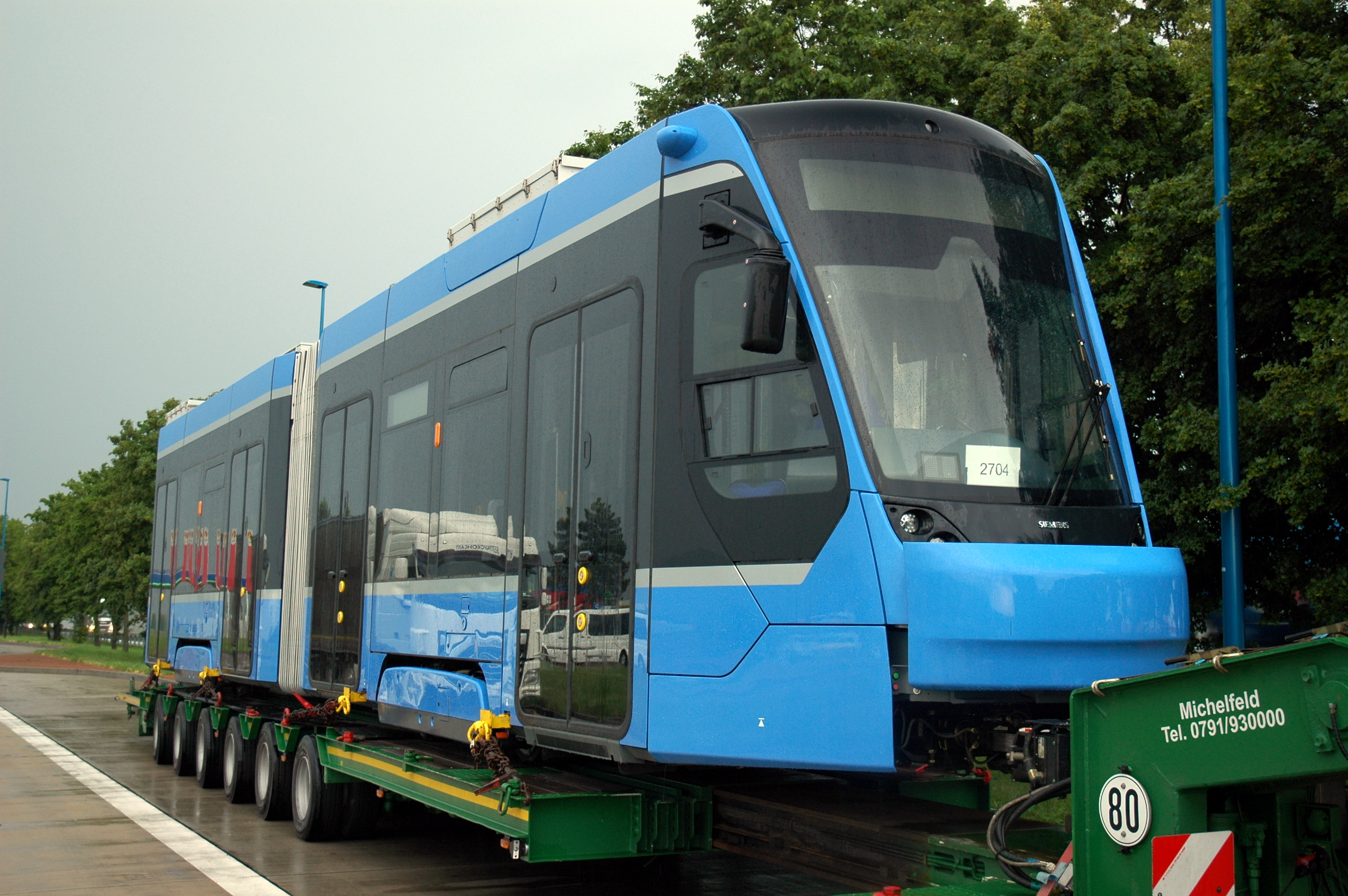
Two-section Avenio on delivery

=== Network ===
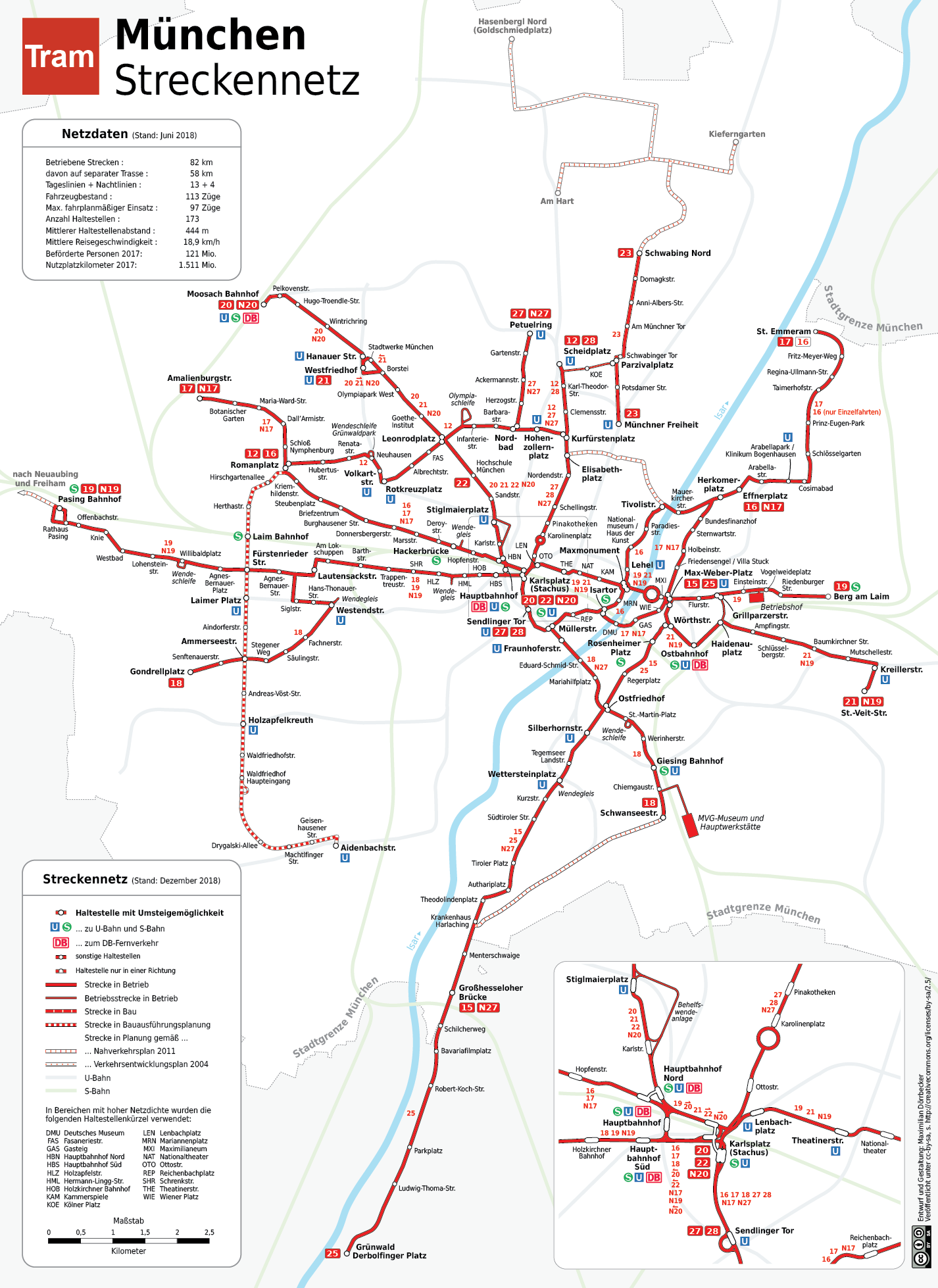
Map of the network

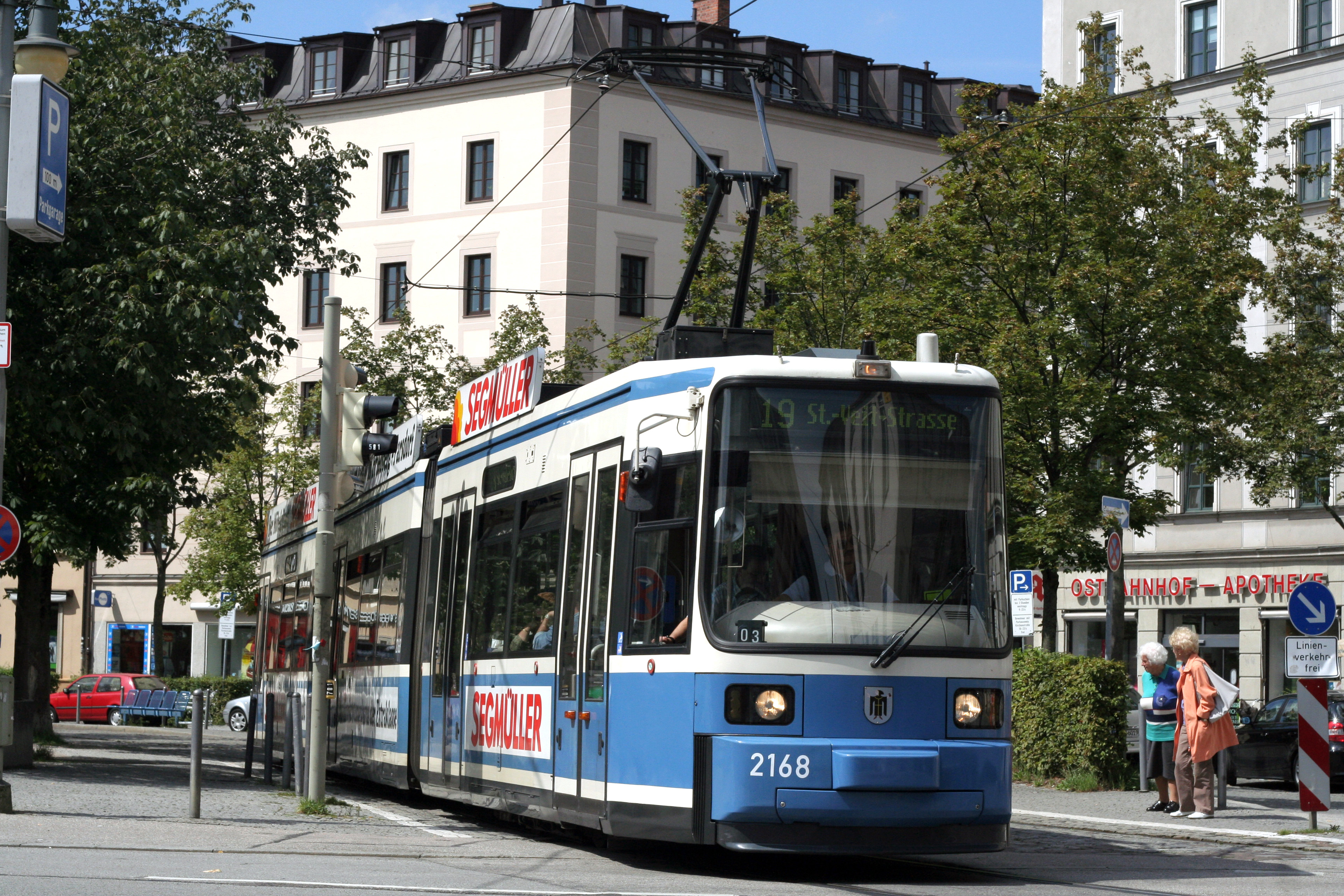
A class R2 tram on route 19 at Ostbahnhof

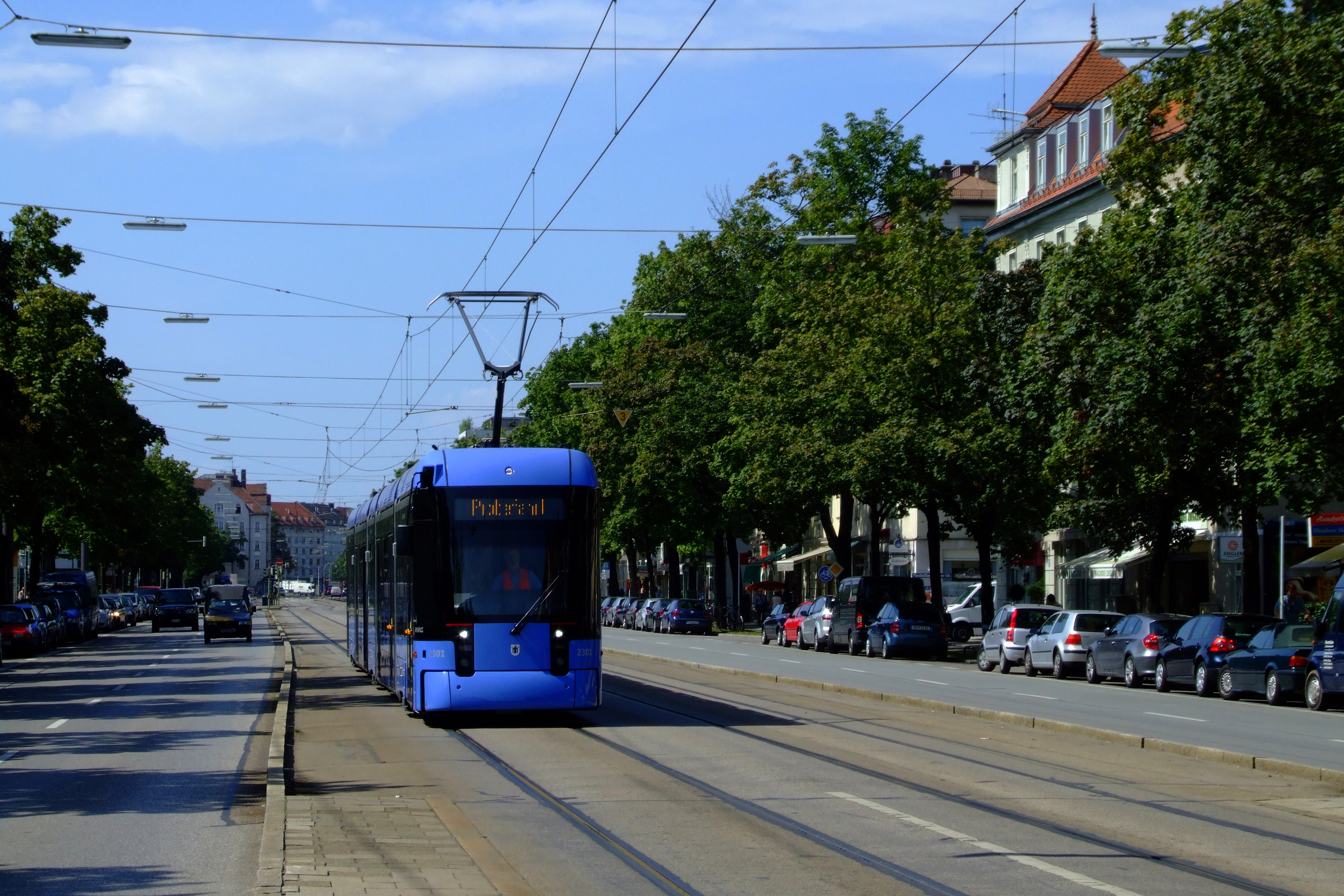
A new class S tram on reserved track

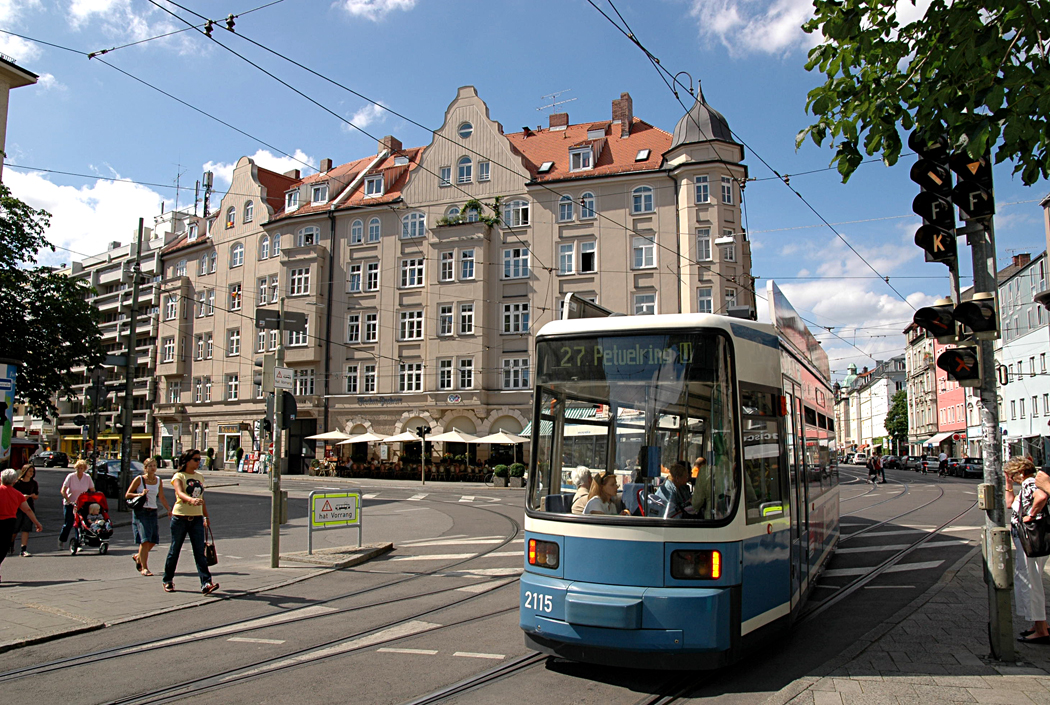
Tram junction at Kurfuerstenplatz

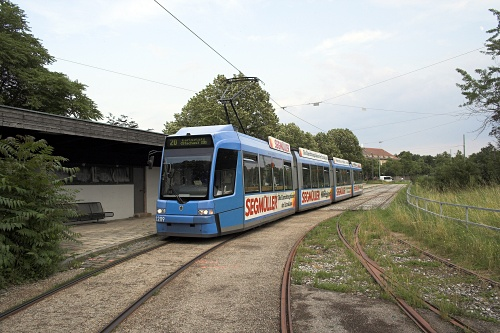
A diverted tram in the extensive, but now little used, Olympic Park tram station

As of 2025, the Munich tram network comprises twelve daytime routes and four night routes. The tram network totals 79 kilometres (49 mi) of route length, including 55 kilometres (34 mi) of segregated tram lane, with 165 stops.

The network is standard gauge track and configured to allow a maximum body width of 2.3 metres (7 ft 7 in). It is electrified using overhead lines at 750 VDC. As all Munich trams are single ended, facilities for turning trams, such as turning loops or wye tracks, are provided at all termini and strategic intermediate points.

==== Daytime routes ====
The daytime route network operates between 04:45 and 01:30, and comprises the following routes:

Line	Route	Stops	Time
12	Schwabing Nord – Scheidplatz – Hohenzollernplatz – Leonrodplatz – Rotkreuzplatz – Romanplatz	17	21 min
14	Pasing – Fürstenrieder Straße – Laimer Platz – Aindorferstraße – Ammerseestraße – Gonderellplatz	14	28 min
16	Romanplatz – Donnersbergerstraße – Hackerbrücke – Hauptbahnhof – Sendlinger Tor – Isartor – Max-Weber-Platz – Herkomerplatz – Effnerplatz – Arabellapark – St. Emmeram	36	49 min
17	Amalienburgstraße – Romanplatz – Donnersbergerstraße – Hackerbrücke – Hauptbahnhof – Karlsplatz – Sendlinger Tor – Fraunhoferstraße – Mariahilfplatz – Ostfriedhof – Giesing Bahnhof – Schwanseestraße	29	35 min
18	Gondrellplatz – Westendstraße – Lautensackstraße – Trappentreustraße – Hauptbahnhof Süd – Karlsplatz – Sendlinger Tor – Isartor – Maxmonument – Tivolistraße – Herkomerplatz – Effnerplatz – Arabellapark – St. Emmeram (Effnerplatz – St. Emmeram during the peak hours only)	32	41 min
19	München-Pasing – Pasing Marienplatz – Fürstenrieder Straße – Lautensackstraße – Trappentreustraße – Hauptbahnhof – Karlsplatz – Theatinerstraße – Maxmonument – Maximilianeum – Max-Weber-Platz – Ostbahnhof – Kreillerstraße – St.-Veit-Straße	36	52 min
20	Moosach – Westfriedhof – Leonrodplatz – Hochschule München –Hauptbahnhof – Karlsplatz	16	22 min
21	Westfriedhof – Leonrodplatz – Hochschule München –Hauptbahnhof – Karlsplatz	13	17 min
23	Münchner Freiheit – Potsdamer Straße – Parzivalplatz – Schwabinger Tor – Am Münchner Tor – Anni-Albers-Straße – Domagkstraße – Schwabing Nord	7	8 min
25	Berg am Laim – Max-Weber-Platz – Rosenheimer Platz – Ostfriedhof – Silberhornstraße – Wettersteinplatz – Großhesseloher Brücke – Grünwald, Derbolfinger Platz	23	32 min
27	Petuelring – Hohenzollernplatz – Karolinenplatz – Karlsplatz – Sendlinger Tor	15	19 min
28	Scheidplatz – Kurfürstenplatz – Karolinenplatz – Karlsplatz – Sendlinger Tor	12	16 min

==== Night routes ====
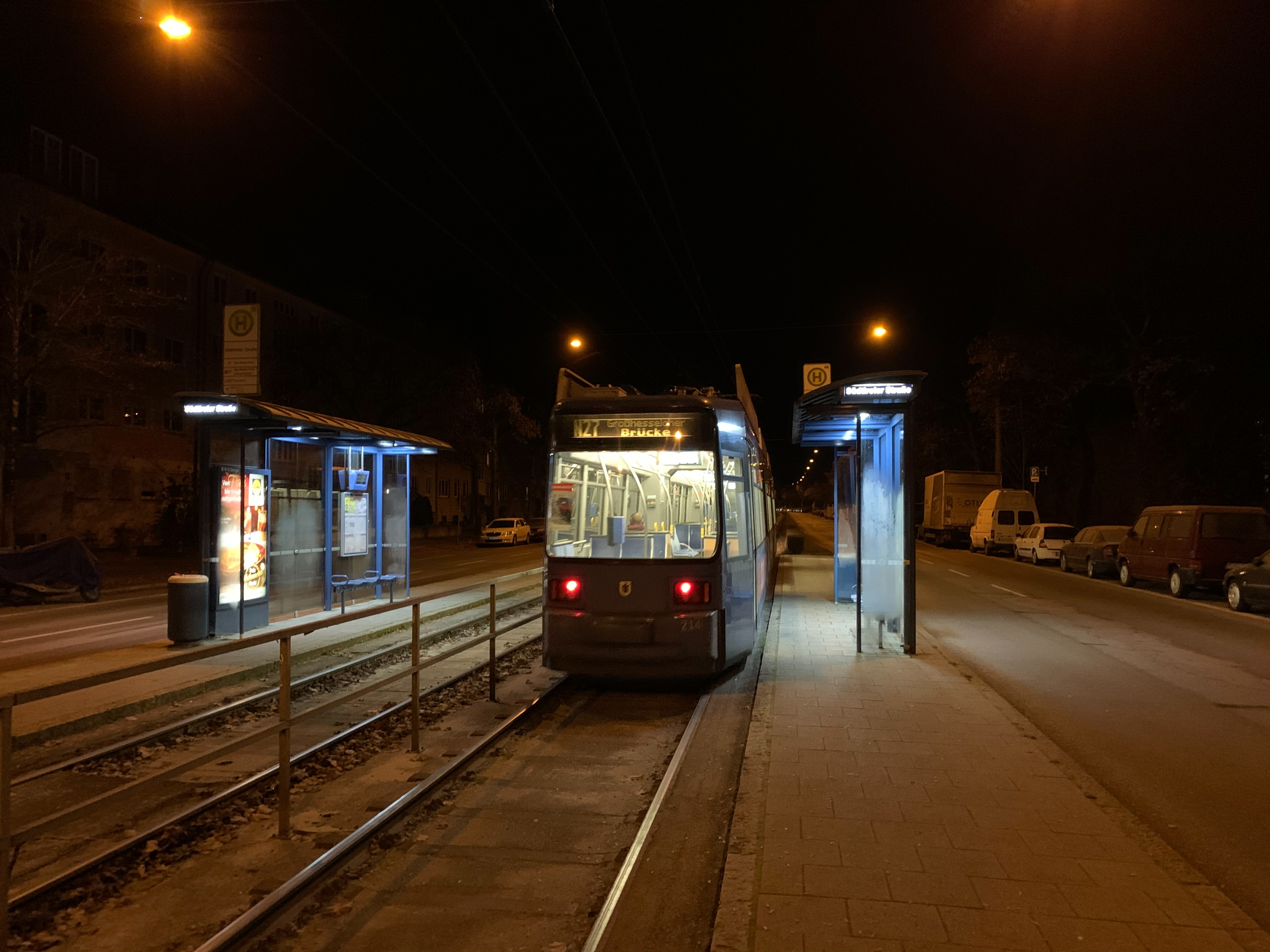
Night line N27 at Südtiroler Straße stop

The night route network operates between 01:30 and 04:30, and comprises the following routes:

Line	Route
N17	Amalienburgstraße – Romanplatz – Donnersbergerstraße – Hackerbrücke – Hauptbahnhof – Karlsplatz – Sendlinger Tor – Isartor – Max-Weber-Platz – Herkomerplatz – Effnerplatz
N19	München-Pasing – Pasing Marienplatz – Fürstenrieder Straße – Lautensackstraße – Trappentreustraße – Hauptbahnhof – Karlsplatz – Theatinerstraße – Maxmonument – Maximilianeum – Max-Weber-Platz – Ostbahnhof – Kreillerstraße – St.-Veit-Straße
N20	Moosach – Westfriedhof – Leonrodplatz – Hauptbahnhof – Karlsplatz
N27	Petuelring – Nordbad – Kurfürstenplatz – Karolinenplatz – Karlsplatz (Stachus) – Sendlinger Tor – Fraunhoferstraße – Mariahilfplatz – Ostfriedhof – Silberhornstraße – Wettersteinplatz – Südtiroler Platz – Großhesseloher Brücke

== Future developments ==
=== Westtangente ===
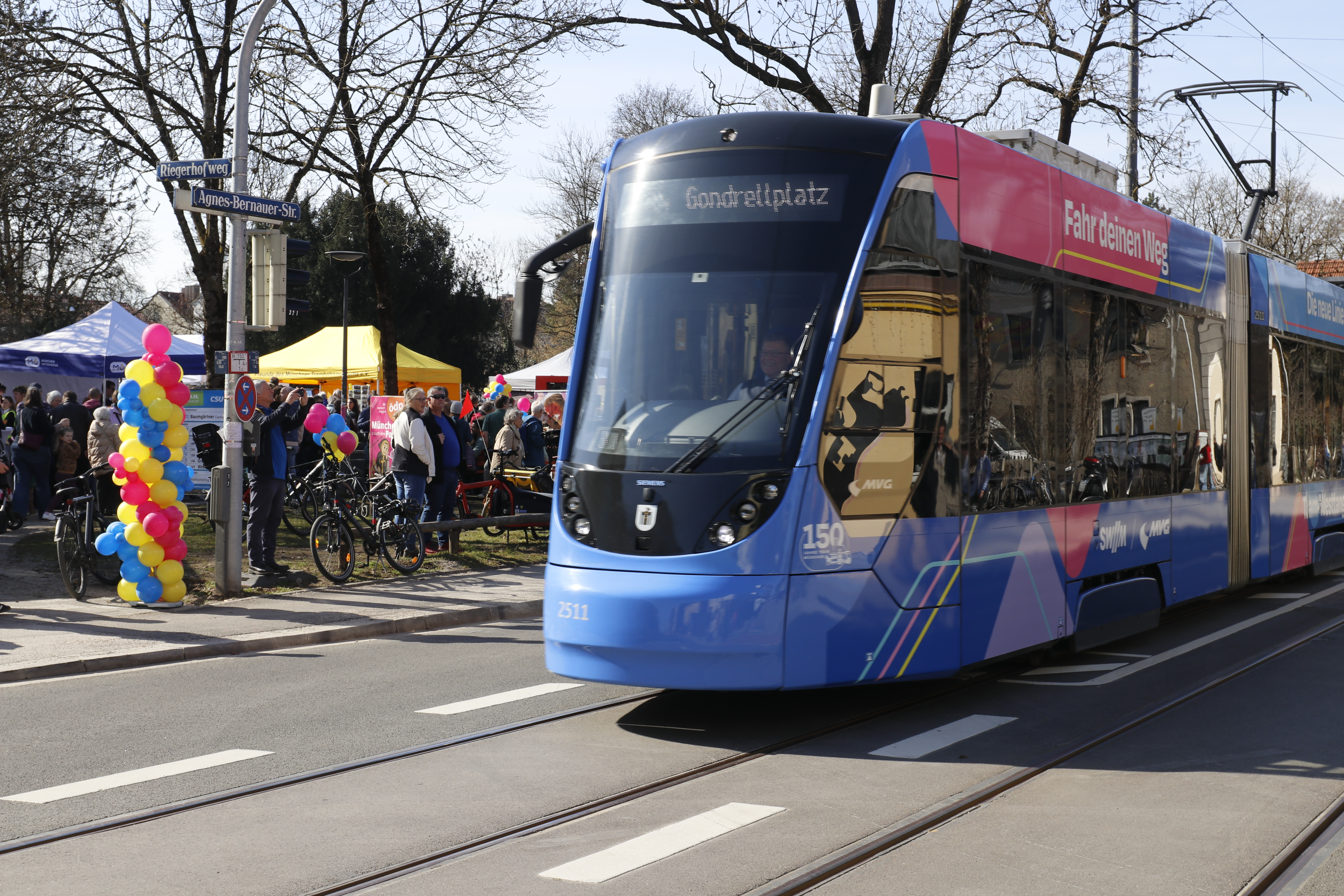
Celebration at the opening of line 14, the first part of Westtangente, February 2026

The new 8.25-kilometre (5.13 mi) Westtangente line is meeting the demand for a crosstown transportation in the west, serving five municipalities: Neuhausen-Nymphenburg, Laim, Sendling-Westpark, Hadern, and Thalkirchen-Obersendling-Forstenried-Fürstenried-Solln. The new line follows mostly the current Metrobus 51 and the 1928 tram extension plan. The line will have seventeen stops with subway transfer points at Aidenbachstraße station (southern terminus), Holzapfelkreuth station, Laimer Platz station, and München-Laim S-Bahn station along with Tram line 12 and lines 16 and 17 at Romanplatz (northern terminus), Tram line 18 at Agnes-Bernauer-Straße, and Tram line 19 at Ammerseestraße. The passengers can transfer to Tram line 12 for further journey to Schwabing, bypassing the city centre. The line number has been determined as Line 14. The €170 million Euro construction, approved on 21 March 2018, began on 7 June 2024 and is planned to be completed by 2028 at the latest. The first phase of the line, from Fürstenrieder Straße to Ammerseestraße, opened on 28 February 2026.

=== Nordtangente (Englischer Garten) ===
Another new tram line project in discussion is the Nordtangente (North Tangent) across the Englischer Garten, linking Elisabethplatz (Trams lines 27 and 28) in the west with terminus at Romanplatz and Tivolistraße (Tram line 16) in the east with terminus at St. Emmeram. Additionally, the proposal also examines the possible southern extension of Tram line 23 to connect with the Nordtangente at Martiusstraße and Leopoldstraße intersection and eastern extension of Tram lines 16 and 17 to the Johanneskirchen S-Bahn station at Johanneskirchner Straße and Cosimastraße.

The Englischer Garten tram line was proposed in 1927 but was immediately rejected by the city council. The proposal for the Nordtangente isn't without controversy due to the feasibility of running trams through the busy thoroughfare and potential damage to the environment during the construction and after the service launch. Several buses (MetroBus 54, 58, and 68 as well as local Bus 154) currently serve the 600-metre-long Englischer Garten thoroughfare, adding noise and congestion. Adding the tram line would cause safety hazard for pedestrians and cyclists who in a very large number share the same thoroughfare.

The overhead lines could not be used due to the sensitive nature environment in Englischer Garten and due to many mature trees in close proximity. An initial proposal was to use the specially modified trams that run on batteries across Englischer Garten before reverting to overhead lines outside the park. MVG and Stadler Rail modified one Class S tram with lithium-ion batteries for feasibility runs at Velten near Berlin: this specially modified tram broke the world distance record by running 16 kilometres (9.9 mi) on a test track. The Class S trams delivered to MVG in 2012 are designed to be retrofitted with batteries.

After the success of Initiative M-ein Englischer Garten, a grassroots movement to cover the portion of Mittleren Ring highway in Englischer Garten, the same grassroot movement group proposed a tram tunnel as the most optimal solution, citing the 1926 article in Bayerischen Umschau. The €45 million tram tunnel is gaining traction as most favoured option for several reasons. The tram tunnel along with forthcoming Mittleren Ring tunnel would reunite the northern and southern Englischer Garten once again. The tunnel moves the tram and bus traffic underground, removing the noise and congestion. Without the traffic on the thoroughfare, the safety of pedestrians and cyclists is enhanced. As to reduce the construction cost by making tunnels lower in height, the overhead lines would not be installed in the tunnel. The trams would switch to battery power during the travel through tunnel before switching back to the overhead lines outside the park.

=== Further extensions ===
- Line 18: Extension to Blumenau in the West
- Line 19: Extension to the Michaelibad in the east
- Hauptbahnhof-Silberhornstraße: Like bus line 58
- Südtangente: From the Aidenbachstraße or the Waldfriedhof, the planned Westtangente via Harras, Brudermühlstraße and Candidplatz could be connected with the line 25 at the Tegernseer Landstraße and on line 17 at the Giesing station.
- Line 19: Extension in the east to Trudering, from there possibly to Haar.
- The line 17 south of Stadelheimer, Nauplia and Seybothstraße could be used instead of U-Bahn line U1 from Mangfallplatz to Krankenhaus Harlaching or the Großhesseloherbrücke. Since this route is currently served (2016) by a bus in the 20-minute clock is sufficiently unlikely.
- From the route to St. Emmeram to one of the S-Bahn stations Englschalking or Johanneskirchen.
- Alte Messe – Nordbad: New route from the Schwanthalerhöhe station via Heimeran- and Schwanthalerstraße to the main station, where the route could be linked to the planning of Hauptbahnhof-Silberhornstraße. The route continues northwards through the Seidl and Schleissheimer Straße to the turning wye at the Nordbad.
- From Munich Moosach station to Moosach or from the Westfriedhof to Untermenzing station
- Line 23: Extension to the south to the planned north-tangente at the Giselastraße. From there, the line could be taken to the Elisabethplatz and further towards the city center.
- An extension of the tram from St. Emmeram to Unterföhring is unlikely because of the nature of the bridge which would be used over the Foehringer Ring and the narrow road in Unterföhring.
- Olympia-Einkaufszentrum – St. Emmeram: New tangent in the north of Munich (like bus line 50)
- Ostbahnhof-Neuperlach: Like bus line 55
