= Munich Class S tram =

German tram

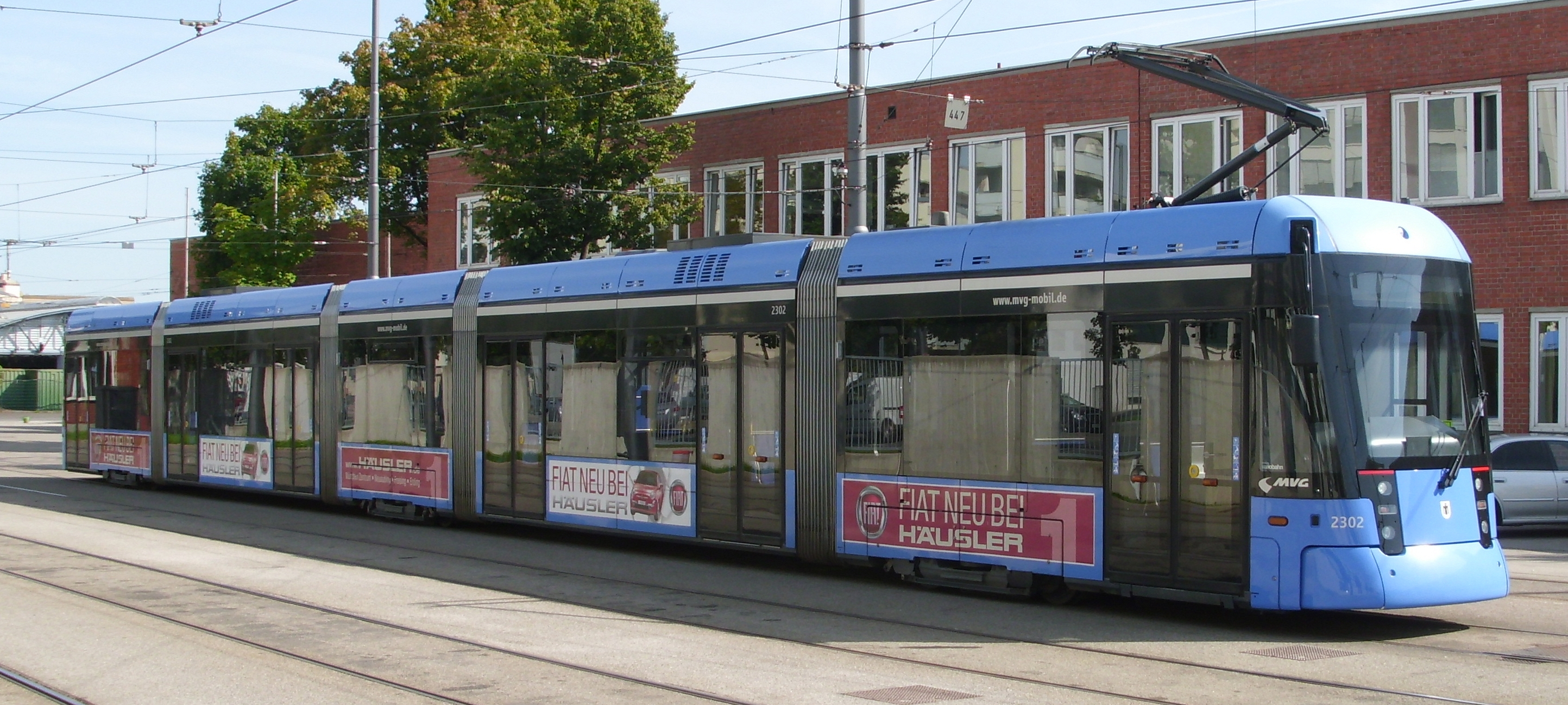
- Car 2302 in Munich, 2010

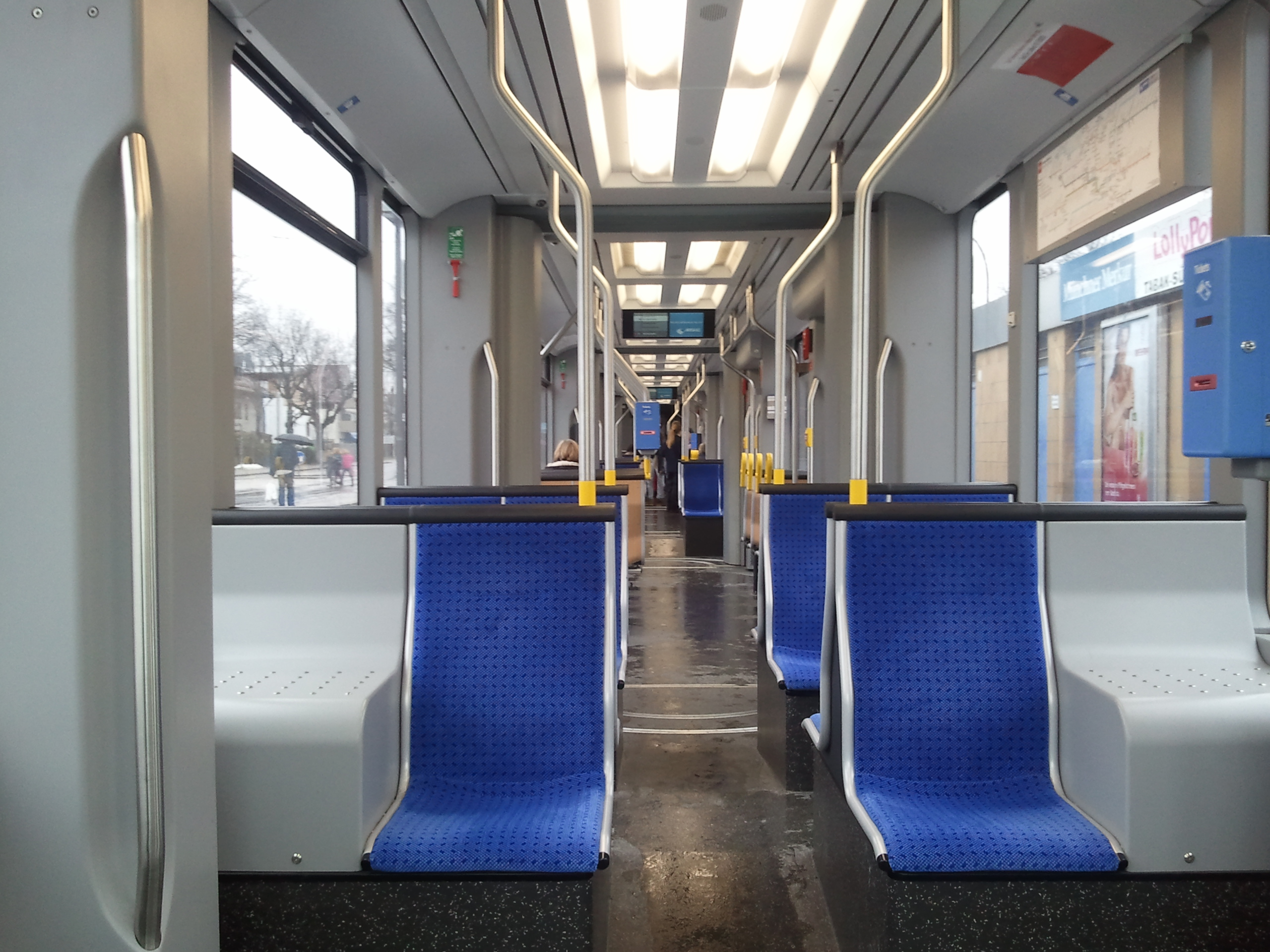
- In service: 2009-present
- Manufacturer: Stadler Rail
- Family name: Variobahn
- Constructed: 2008–2011
- Number built: 14
- Fleet numbers: 2301–2304; 2311–2320
- Capacity: 75 seated and 146 standing (4 Pers./m²)

Specifications
- Train length: 33.94 m (111 ft 4 in)
- Width: 2.3 m (7 ft 7 in)
- Height: 3.58 m (11 ft 9 in)
- Floor height: 350–360 mm (14–14 in) (Note: Stadler Rail gives the floor height as 350 mm (14 in) (source Archived 2013-07-23 at the Wayback Machine; PDF; 503 kB) while MVG lists the floor height as 360 mm (14 in) (source).)
- Low-floor: 100%
- Platform height: 300 mm (12 in)
- Articulated sections: 4
- Wheel diameter: 650 mm (26 in)
- Maximum speed: 60 km/h (35 mph)
- Weight: 40 t (39 long tons; 44 short tons)
- Traction motors: 8 × 45 kW (60 hp)
- Power output: 360 kW (483 hp)
- Electric system(s): 750 V DC overhead catenary
- Current collector(s): Pantograph
- UIC classification: Bo'2'Bo'
- Minimum turning radius: 14.5 m (47 ft 7 in)
- Track gauge: 1,435 mm (4 ft 8 1/2 in) standard gauge

The class S tram is an articulated electric motor tram built by Stadler Rail for use on the Munich tramway. The units were built off Stadler's Variobahn design and are operated by MVG. The five-section 100% low-floor trams have a total length of 33.94 metres (111 ft 4 in). The first delivered S-car, number 2301, was used for the first time in Munich on 19 March 2009 for a press tour. As of December 2015, the S series currently operates on lines 17, 19, 20, 21 and 22.

A total of 14 trams were built between 2008 and 2011. The vehicles are designed for 221 passengers each. The top speed is 60 km/h (37 mph). After problems with the running gear shortly after delivery, no further trams of this series were bought. Instead, MVG ordered Siemens Avenio vehicles for their class T1 vehicles.

== History ==
=== Order and commissioning ===
In order to retire the last three trains of the aging P series, MVG planned to buy additional ADtranz low floor trams in a joint order with VAG Nuremberg. However, owing to Bombardier's discontinuation of this product line following their takeover of ADtranz in 2001, the price quoted was higher than that of newer models. MVG therefore instead ordered three Variobahn trains in a joint purchase with VAG in October 2002. Shortly thereafter, a further Variobahn was ordered as a replacement for a R-wagon heavily damaged by a construction crane and another 18 wagons were put on option. In order to meet the increased demand caused by the newly established line 23, MVG ordered a further ten vehicles of the type on September 2, 2008, so that the order ultimately consisted of 14 units. The total costs amounted to around 40 million euro with each individual tram amounting to 3 million euro.

The first car, number 2301, was presented to the public at InnoTrans Berlin in September 2008 and delivered on March 11. Eight days later, the vehicle was introduced to the Munich press by Munich's Lord Mayor Christian Ude and MVG boss Herbert König and completed its maiden journey. In the same year three other cars, numbers 2302 to 2304, were finished and delivered. All four trains received only a provisional authorization, since among other things it was believed that the tram carriages would not adhere to the track gauge; additionally the new trains were not allowed to pass the older P-cars at speed. In December 2008, following a timetable change, the cars entered service on lines 20 and 21, and also later on line 19. The approval was abruptly aborted by the Oberbayern technical supervisory authority on 19 July 2010 due to problems with the chassis, meaning that the trains could no longer be used in regular service until December 2011. The delivery of the other cars was scheduled for mid-2011 but they did not come until spring 2012. They entered service on the lines 19, 20 and 21, and on line 22 since December 2012 replacing older vehicles on those lines.

=== First issues ===
At the end of March 2012, MVG announced that damage had occurred to the wheels of nine cars, where the rubber grommets between the tire and the wheel had cracked after a few weeks and had to be replaced. A commissioned report mentioned errors in the composition and the production of the rubber elements as a cause. The issue of definitive authorization, planned on April 1, 2012, was thereby halted. In order to keep the lines running, the planned conversion of the predecessor R series trains was delayed, and plans were drafted to borrow trams from other companies. The rubber parts were finally replaced in summer 2012, with the provisional approval extended by nine months, to approve the new parts. Following further software changes to the doors and air-conditioning systems, the final approval of the trams was postponed again from 31 May to 30 September 2013, when the trams received their final approval. On 10 May 2016 the trams received approval to operate lines 17, 27 and 28.

Due to the deficiencies with the trains, a transitional timetable was put in place for 2013, which added extra peak time journeys using the trams if they were available, and the replacement of the trams with buses if they were not. In addition, since the timetable change, the trams have been used on the newly opened line 22. Owing to the problems with the trams, MVG announced on 28 September 2012 that they had chosen not to exercise their option of a further eight trams, instead ordering eight new Siemens Avenio trams, designated as the T series.

=== Further cracks and return to service ===
On 12 December 2014, during maintenance work, cracks were discovered on the underside of the wagon boxes on seven different trams, which were then put out of operation. The other six trams approved for passenger operation showed no abnormalities, with MVG implementing shorter periods between checks for the six unaffected trams. After further inspections by Stadler, on 7 January 2015, TAB, the Technical Supervisory Authority, ordered that vehicles which had not previously been affected by the damage should also decommissioned and remedied. The vehicles were returned to service in May.
