= MVG Museum =

Museum

Coordinates: 48°06′08.20″N 11°36′07.25″E

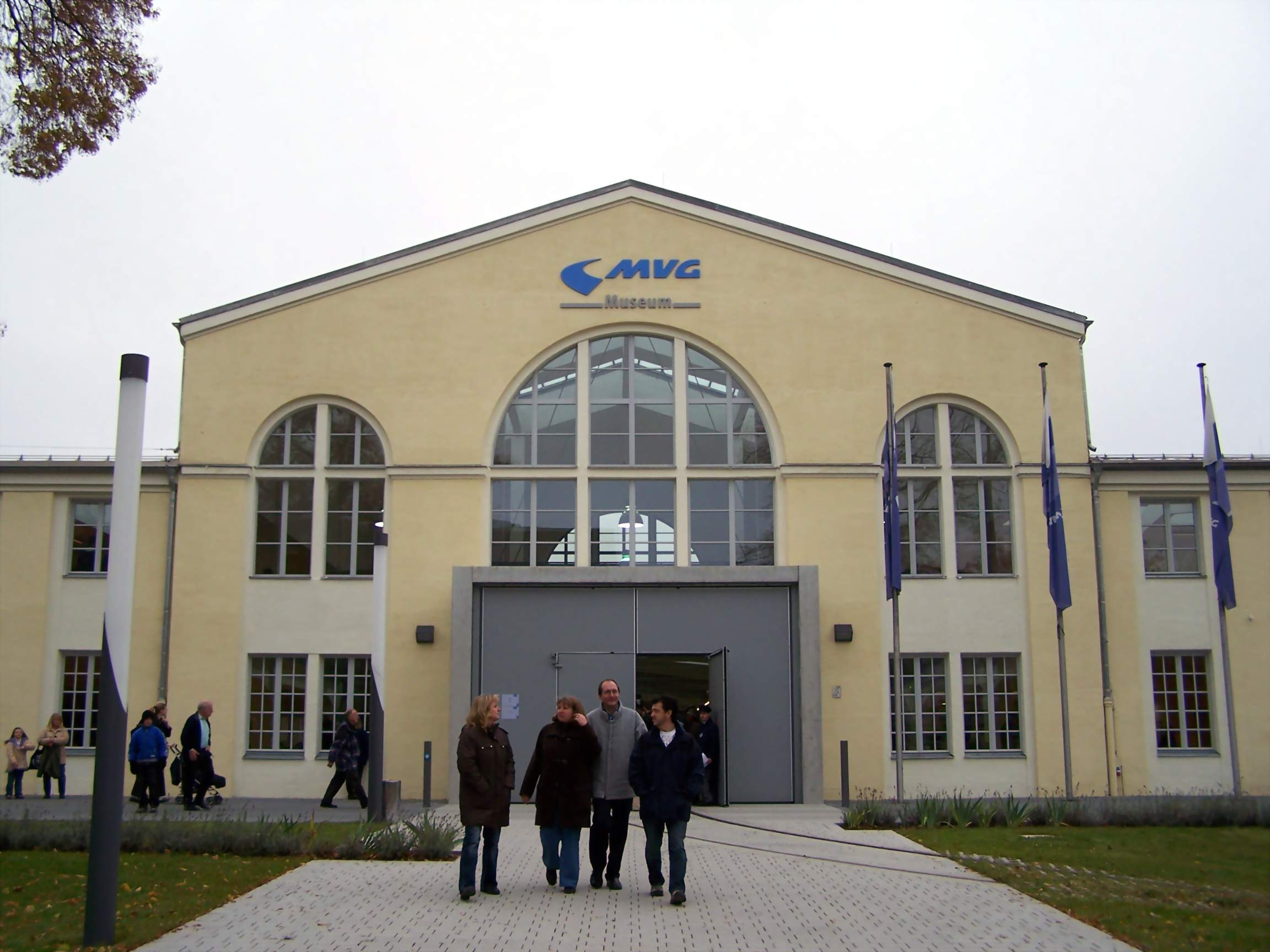
Entrance of MVG Museum

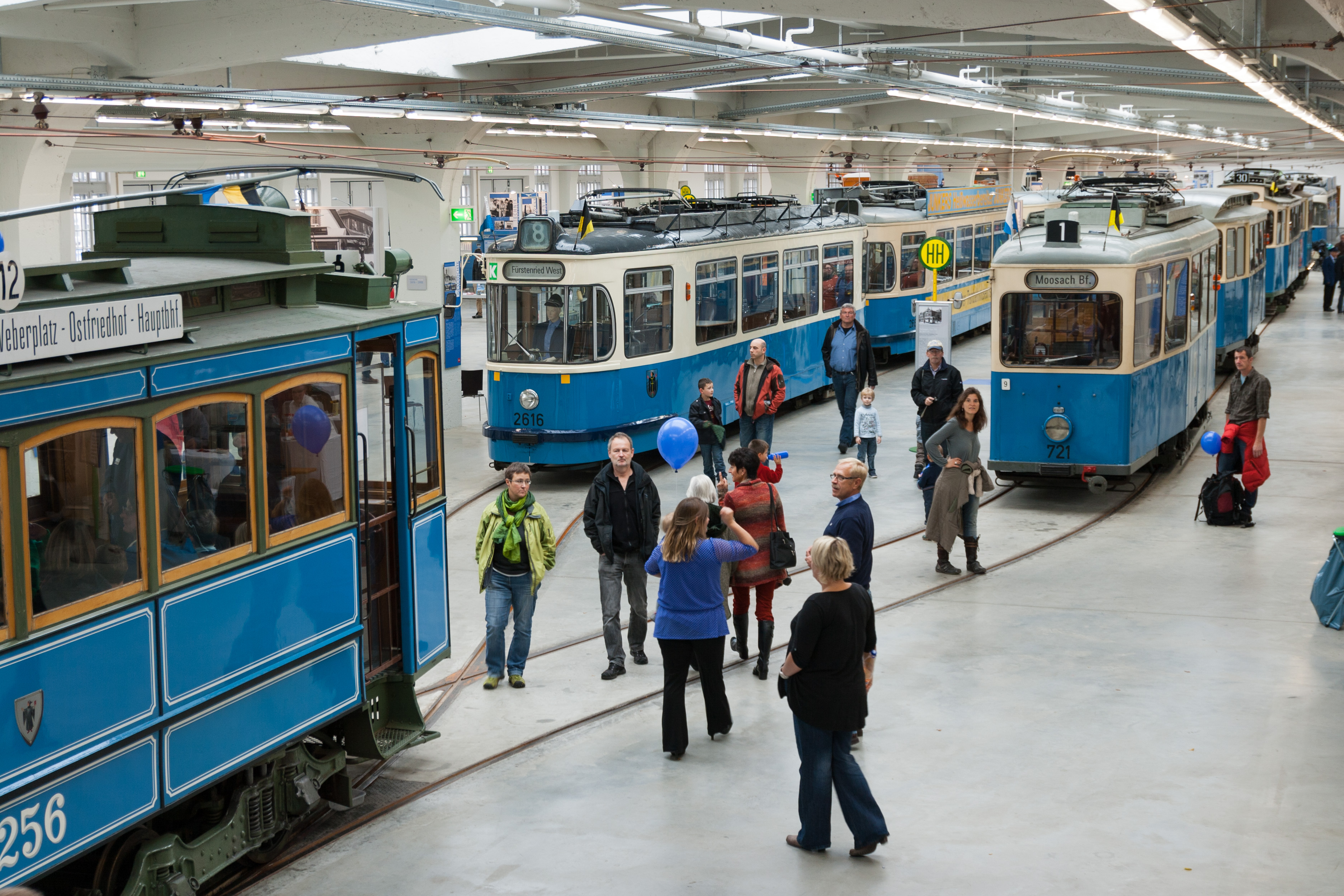
MVG Museum

The MVG Museum of the Münchner Verkehrsgesellschaft is a public transportation museum for the presentation of historical and modern public transportation in Munich. In an area of over 5,000 square meters (54,000 sq ft) are around 25 historical trams, buses and work vehicles on exhibit. The streetcars are arranged on two tracks leading through the entire hall. The "CVs" are also displayed for each vehicle. In addition, the museum present more than 150 billboards and other exhibits, such as a subway simulator in an original car from the 1980s, several tramway driving switches, historical paintings, a small cinema and a model railroad exhibition. The MVG-Museum is located in a part of the historically protected Ausbesserungswerk at Ständlerstraße 20 in Ramersdorf. It was opened on 28 October 2007. The museum is open to the public two Sundays each month.

== Events ==
The Main building and the large hall of the museum also serve as an event location. In addition to all the well-known events held in the MVG Museum in Munich, Braukunst Live! has been held there since 2012.

== See also ==
- Deutsches Museum
- List of museums in Germany
