= Stammstrecke 1 (Munich U-Bahn) =

Principal line of the Munich subway system

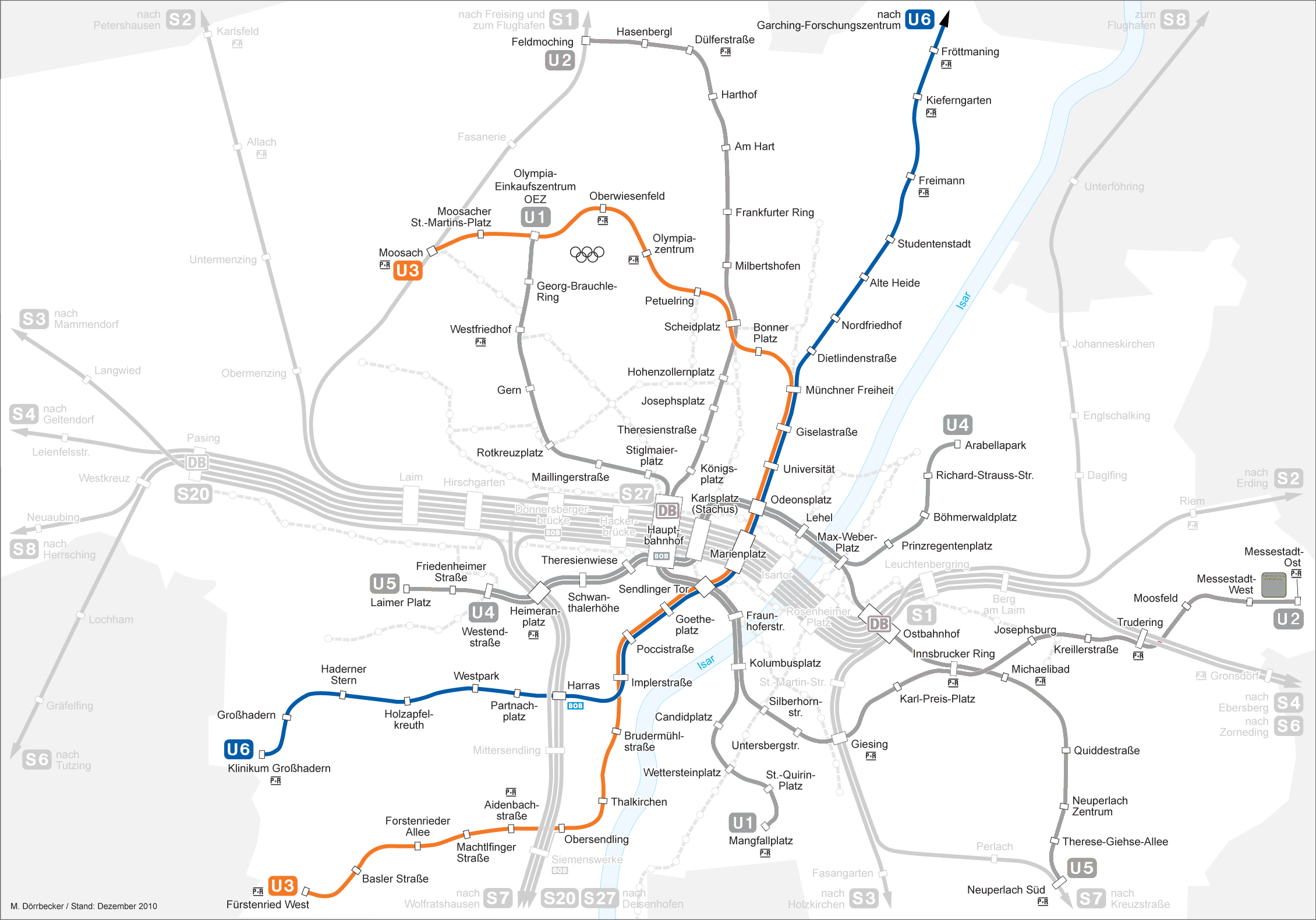
Course of the Stammstrecke 1

The Stammstrecke 1 of the Munich U-Bahn is the first, of a total of three realized main routes, in the subway network of the Bavarian capital Munich. It runs mainly in north–south direction and is currently used by the two subway lines, the U3 and U6. Also, since 15 December 2013, the additional amplifier line, the U8, runs on Saturdays on the section Olympiazentrum-Scheidplatz. Between the subway stations Münchner Freiheit and Implerstraße, the lines U3 and U6 run on the same route, before, or after which they branch off and the two lines are then run each on a separate route. The mainline 1 has a total length of 41 kilometers and passes 42 subway stations. It does not run exclusively in Munich urban areas, but for a distance of about eight kilometers in the northern area of Garching. A large part of the northern section of the U6 runs above ground, the remaining part completely in tunnels.

On 19 October 1971, the operation was recorded on the first main line with the U6 line. In the following years, twelve expansions or extensions were put into operation at irregular intervals. Most recently, the section between the subway stations Olympia-Einkaufszentrum and Moosach was opened in 2010. An extension from Großhadern to Martinsried is planned, but a construction start has not been set.

== History ==
The U6 runs on the oldest Munich subway route. The Lindwurmtunnel (section between Sendlinger Tor, including Goetheplatz station) was built as early as 1938-41 as part of a north–south rapid-transit railway line, which is essentially today's course of the U6. For this reason, the Goetheplatz station is a few meters longer than the usual 120 meter platform length, since it was designed for other trains. The tunnel was integrated into the construction of the U6 route from 1 February 1965. Starting on 19 October 1971, the first trains drove between Kieferngarten and Goetheplatz.

The construction of the U3 line was drastically accelerated when Munich was awarded the contract for the 1972 Summer Olympics in the mid-1960s. In 1966, the line network plan adopted only a year earlier was revised and the U3 was defined as a feeder to the Olympic site, since the originally planned route over the main station could not be realized in the short time. In addition, the direct connection to the technical base located in Fröttmaning was considered necessary for the operation. The stations, which were not already put into operation in the course of the opening of the U6 (Bonner place to Olympia center), were opened on 8 May 1972.

On 22 November 1975, the stops Implerstraße and Harras were opened. Already at that time the Implerstrasse station was built as a junction station, although the southern branch of the U3 only came into operation 14 years later. The U3 ended at Harras, where there was now a second transfer possibility to the S-Bahn. The Poccistraße station, between Goetheplatz and Implerstraße, was built later on and opened on 28 May 1978. The section through Partnachplatz and Westpark to Holzapfelkreuth was opened for the International Horticultural Exhibition (IGA) on 16 April 1983 as a flower line. The design of the three stations, which follows the same basic pattern, was awarded the International Design Prize 1983/84.

The southern branch of the route was only advanced in the 1980s. From 28 October 1989, it was possible to travel from the Implerstrasse underground station to the former end terminal of Forstenrieder Allee. As a result, the section between Implerstraße and Holzapfelkreuth was no longer served by the U3. On 1 June 1991, the present end terminal Fürstenried West was reached. The previous tram line 16 (Harras - Ratzingerplatz - Fürstenried) had served its purpose and was constructed and extended in stages.

Further route extensions in the south to the Klinikum Großhadern (on 22 May 1993) and in the north to Fröttmaning (on 30 June 1994) and further to Garching-Hochbrück (on 28 October 1995) followed.

For the connection of the Allianz Arena, the Fröttmaning station was rebuilt between 10 October 2002 and 4 May 2005. The station was moved about half a platform length to the north, the existing platform was demolished, a second platform was built and north of the now four-track station, a new parking facility built. The current station is completely roofed in and now also has an access at the northern end, which connects directly to the esplanade of the Allianz Arena.

For a long time, Freimann was the last subway station, which was not wheelchair accessible. Since August 2006, three elevators have been retrofitted, so that since June 2009, this station is easily accessible for mobility-impaired people.

The Garching area route runs past the Garching Research Center, through Garching and Garching-Hochbrück, just about up to Fröttmaning Station, and was built by the City of Garching with financial aid from the Free State of Bavaria and the Munich district, and opened on 14 October 2006. MVG is commissioned with the operation and lease track facilities, railway stations and two long-distance trains from Garching.

Until 2007, the U3 line ended in the north of the city at the Olympiazentrum station. At the end of October 2007, the two stations, Oberwiesenfeld and Olympia-Einkaufszentrum, were opened. In December 2010, the extension through the Moosacher St.-Martins Square to Moosach was opened, and connected to the S1.

== Course ==
=== North (U3) ===
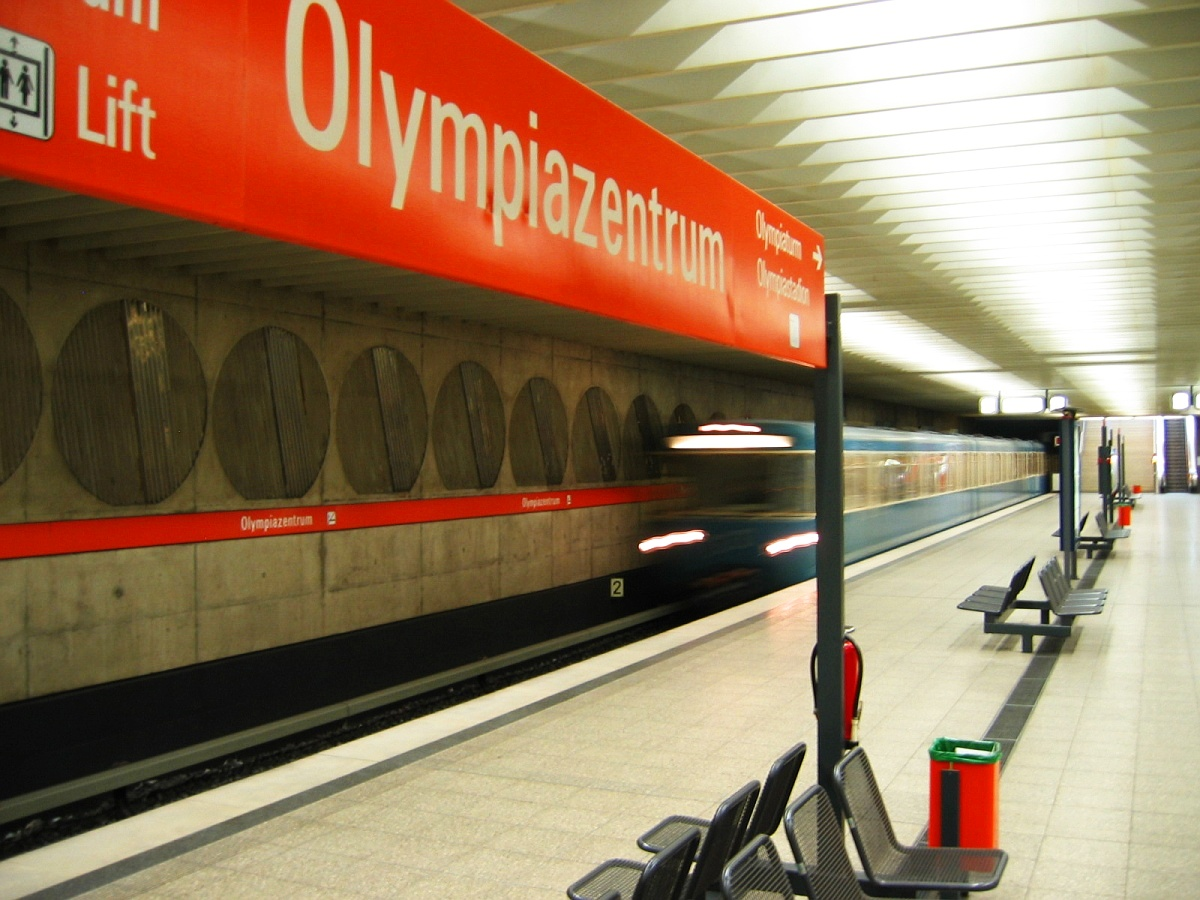
Olympiazentrum

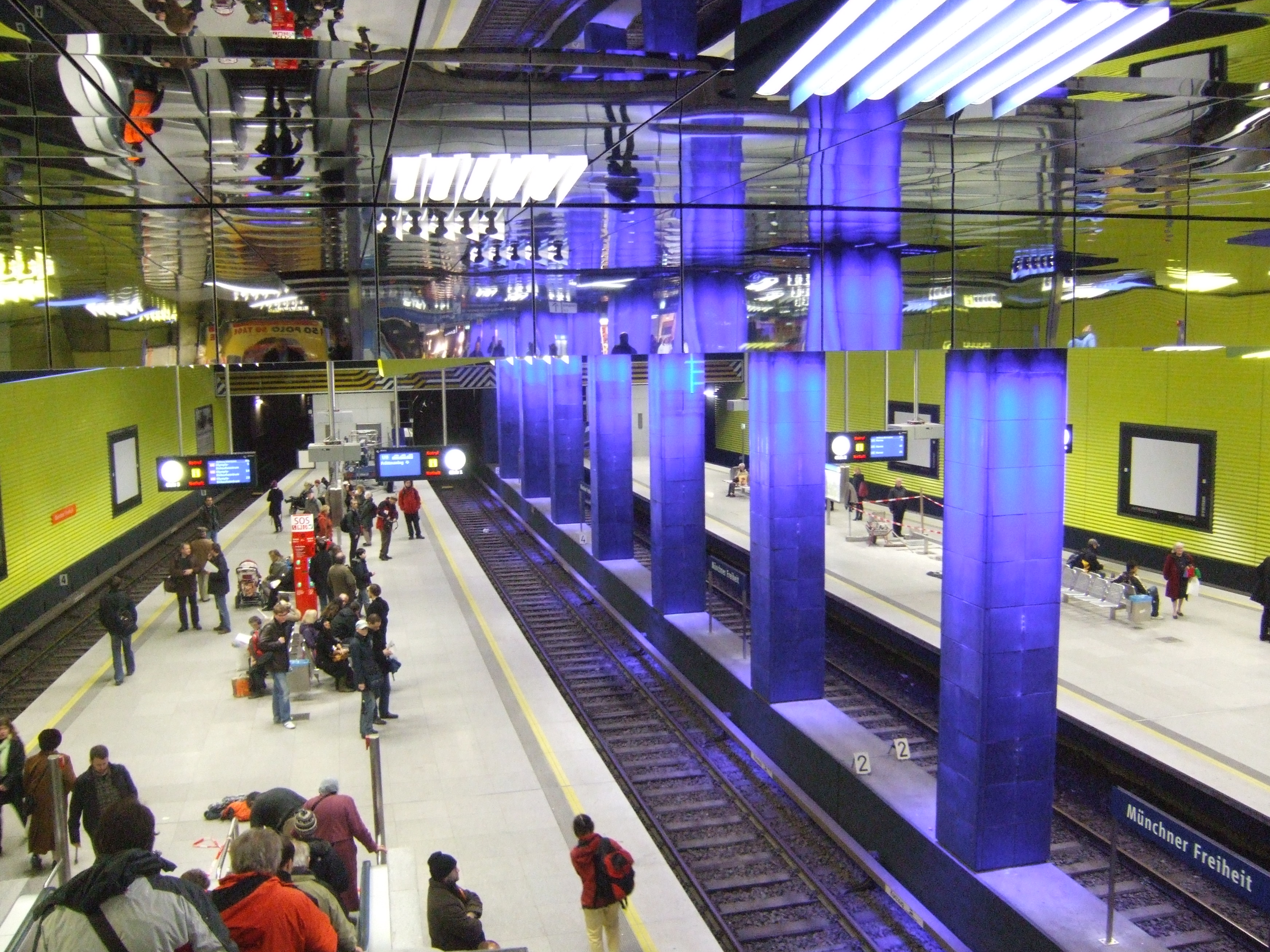
Münchner Freiheit

In the north, since December 2010, the U3 starts at the Moosach station. Via the Moosacher St.-Martins-Platz, the route leads to the Olympia-Einkaufszentrum station, where the U1 begins. Via the Oberwiesenfeld station, which surrounds the northern part of the Olympic Park, the four-track Olympiazentrum station is reached, where the U3, from 1972 to 2007 had its northern endpoint.

For the current Olympiazentrum station, was temporarily the name Oberwiesenfeld provided, which is why in the route schedules Olympiazentrum (Oberwiesenfeld) can be found. To preserve the original name of the district in the cityscape, the working title Olympiapark North was discarded.

Via the Petuelring station, the Scheidplatz is reached, where a connection to the U2 can be made from the same opposing platform at the same time. Via Bonner Platz, the Münchner Freiheit station is reached, where the route joins the common U3 / U6 main line.

The four stations Olympiazentrum, Petuelring, Scheidplatz and Bonner Platz, are all made of exposed concrete with reliefs on the walls, while the orange color for the U3 is reflected in the line band and other architecture in the station. They deviate in form and design quite strongly from the basic form of the, only shortly before planned and executed stations of the U6, - due to the Olympic decision and the associated reputation justifying an independent appearance of the stations.

=== North (U6) ===
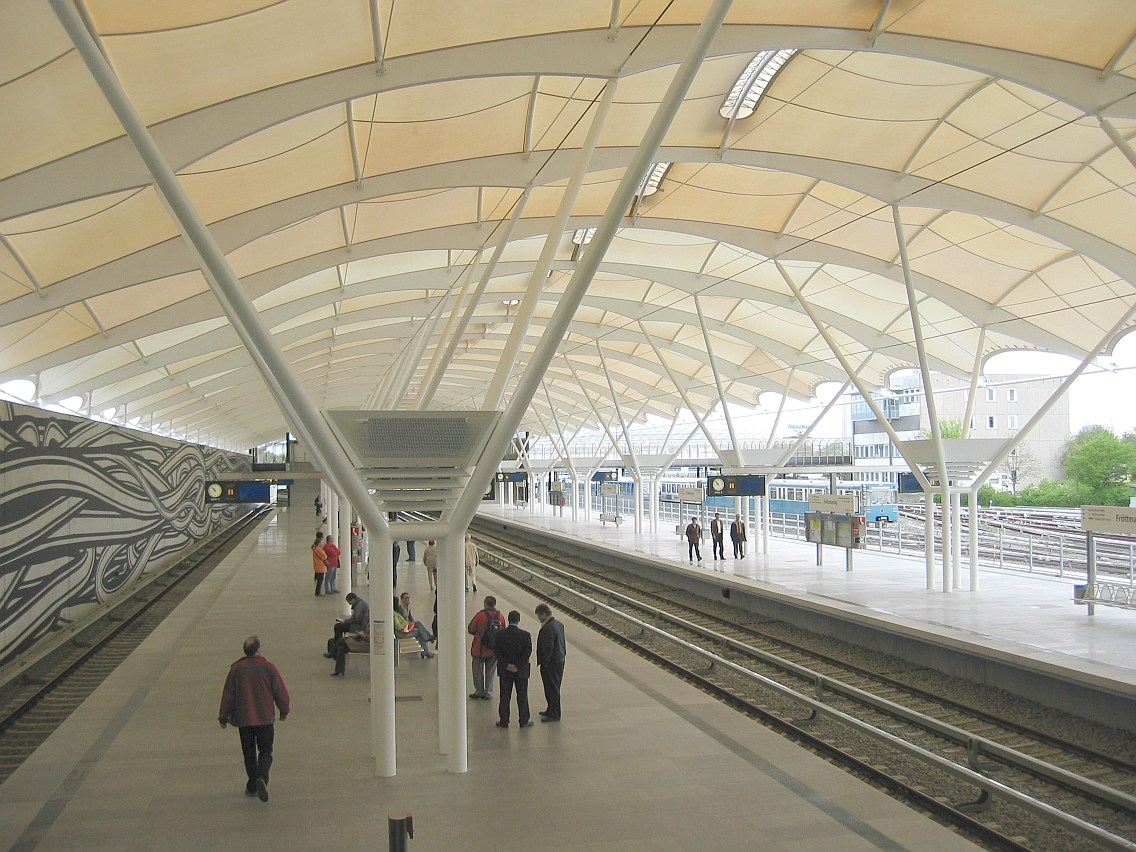
Fröttmaning

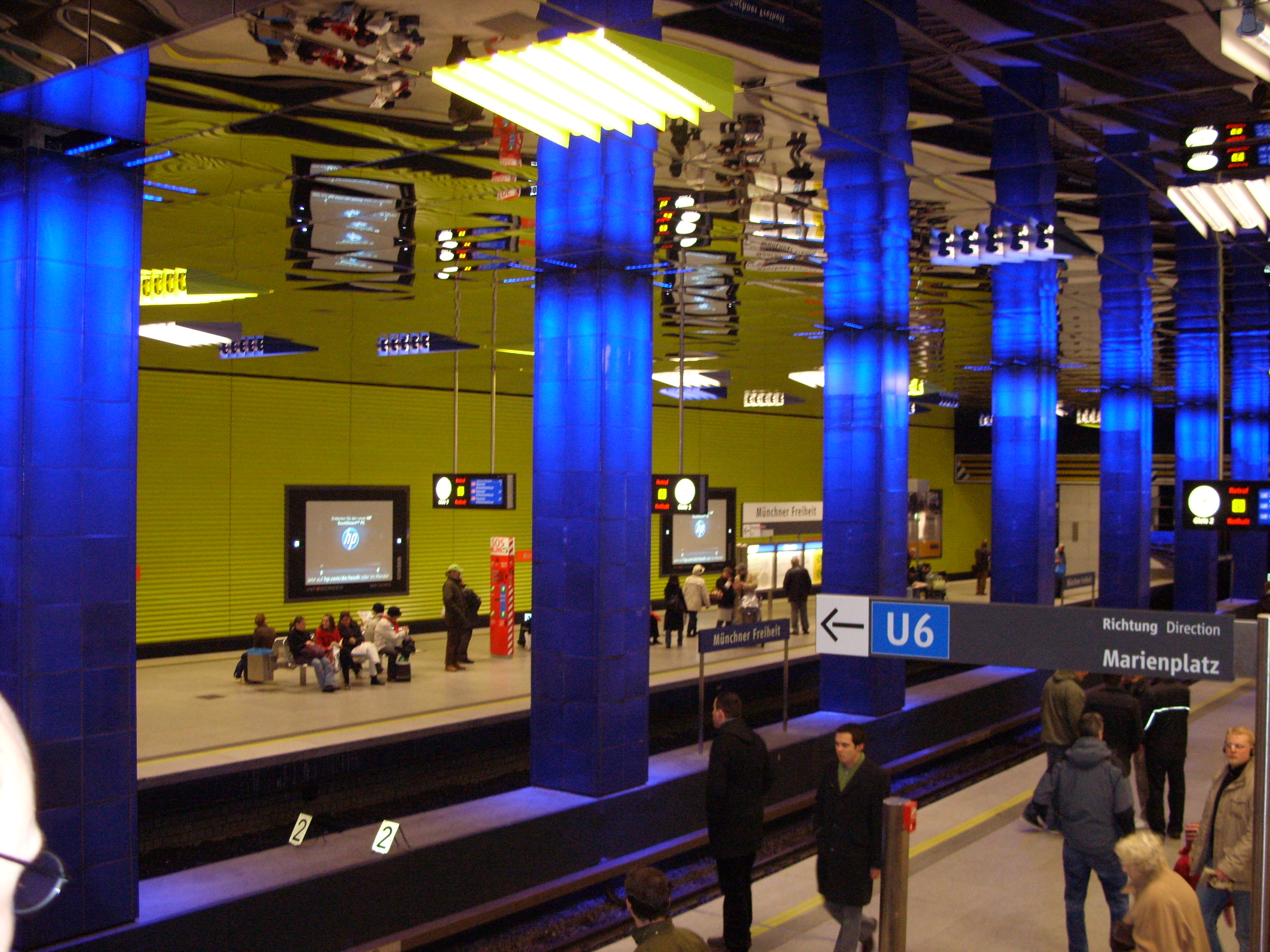
Münchner Freiheit

The U6 begins underground in the north at the Garching Research Center, the section from Garching to Garching Hochbrück was opened on 14 October 2006. The station at Forschungszentrum, which is located at a low elevation, connects the adjacent research center to it by rail for the first time, shortly thereafter the U6 comes to the surface for about 500 meters. After this short aboveground section, the 17-meter-deep tunnel station Garching is reached, located under the Garching Maibaumplatz. Then the track comes to light again shortly before Garching-Hochbrück.

The section between Garching-Hochbrück and the next station, rebuilt for the Allianz Arena, Fröttmaning, is about 4.1 km and the longest section between two stations in the Munich network. This section also underpasses the Munich Highway ring.

In Fröttmaning, the technical base with the main workshop of the Munich subway is located. From the Kieferngarten station, which is four-lane due to the connection to the technical base and the associated entry and exit trips, the line leads over the 450-meter-long Heidemann bridge to the Freimann station, which is located directly next to the A9 highway. Which is crossed underground, like the Frankfurter Ring and the Munich North Ring, to which a track connection occurs at this point. The next station, Studentenstadt, is located next to the Ungererstraße, whose course the track now follows.

After Studentenstadt, the U6 disappears for the rest of its course, underground. The three following stations designed by Paolo Nestler, Alte Heide, Nordfriedhof (next to Garching-Hochbrück the only station with side train entry on the U6) and Dietlindenstraße, are all under the Ungererstraße. The Nordfriedhof station is also located below the Mittlerer Ring. The track then connects in the Münchner Freiheit station to the common U3 / U6 main line.

=== Center (U3 and U6) ===
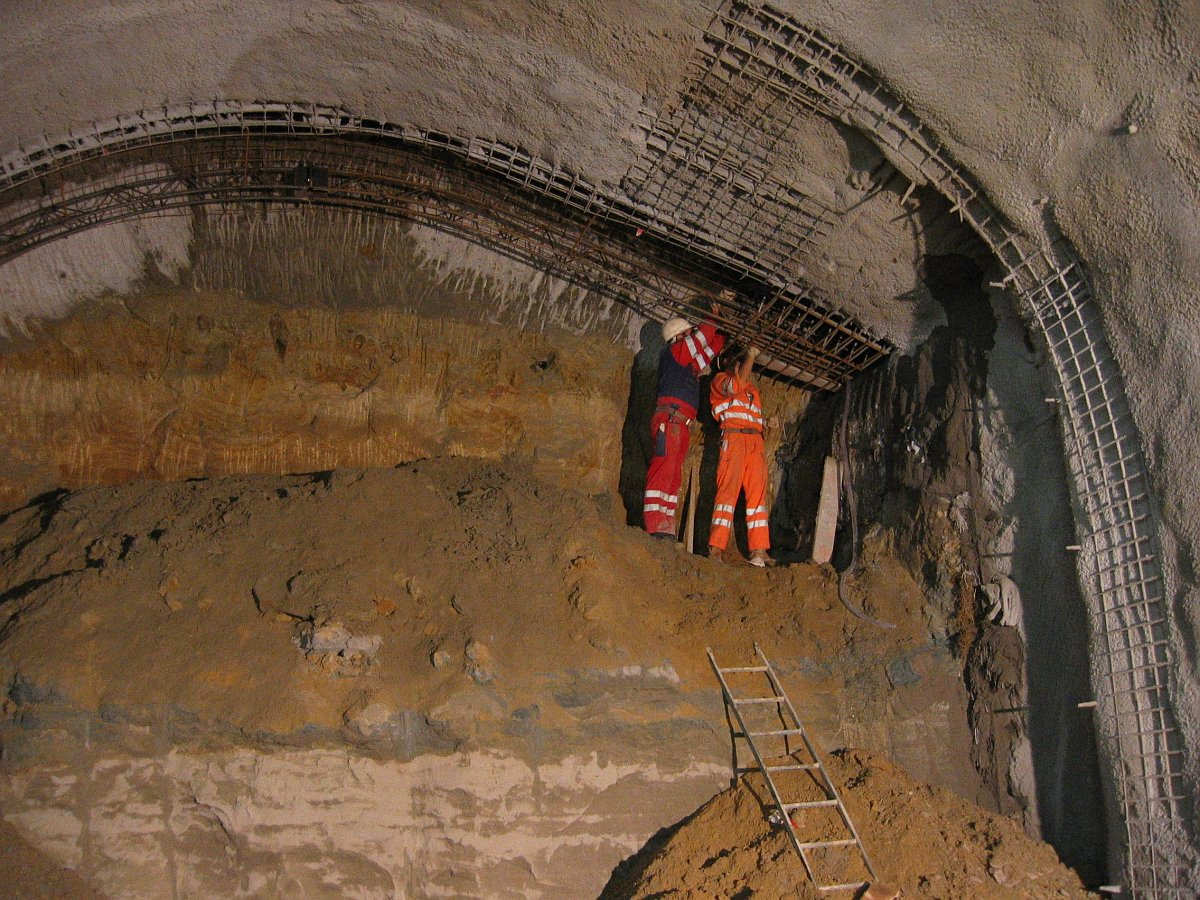
Construction work for a relief tunnel at Marienplatz

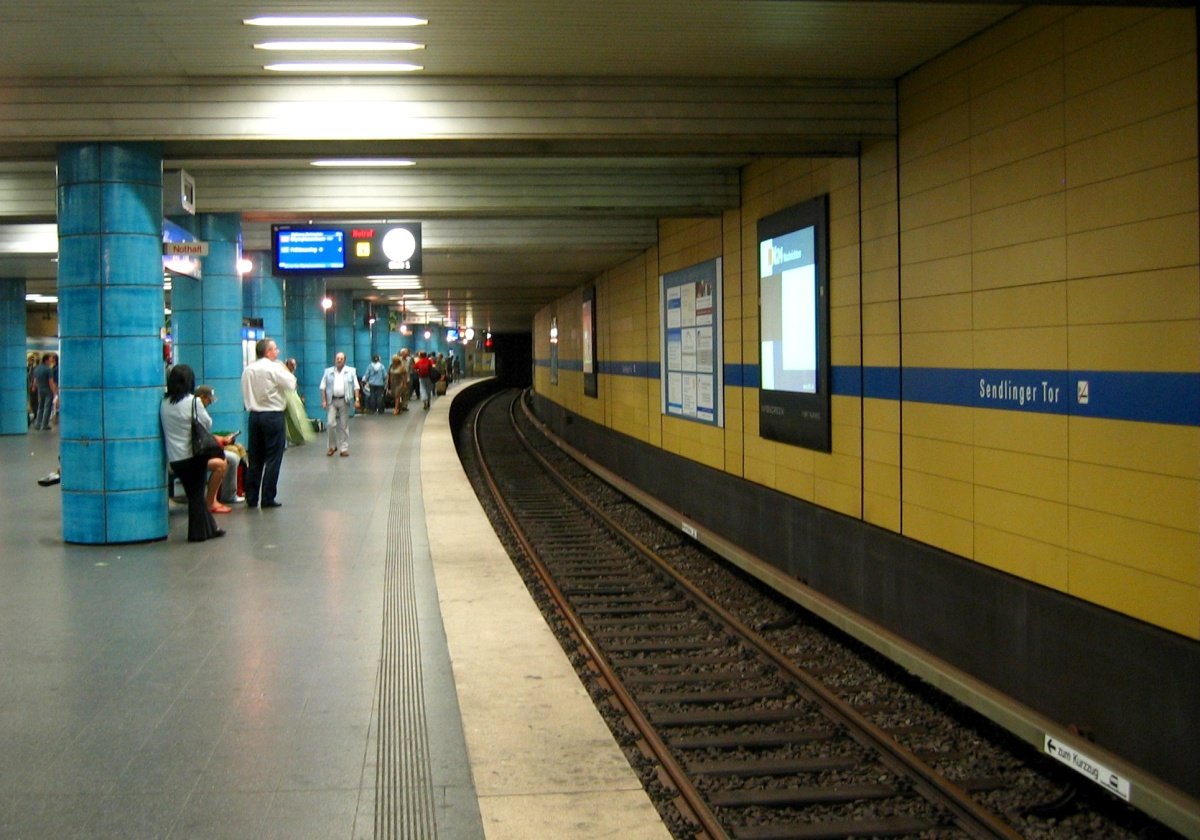
Sendlinger Tor

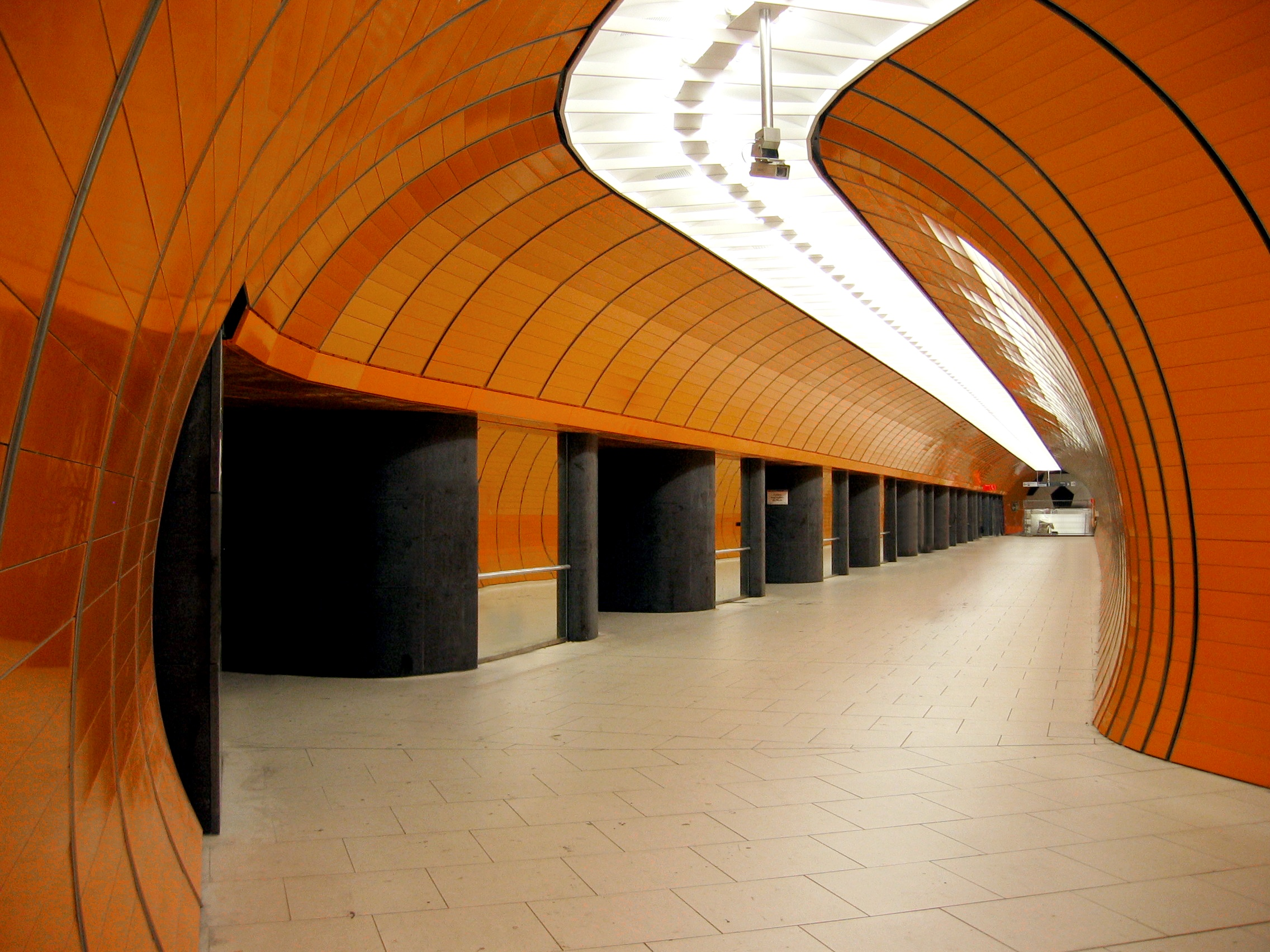
Parallel platform on Marienplatz; between the black pillars are passages to the actual platform

After Giselastraße and Universität, the U3 crosses the U4 and U5 lines at Odeonsplatz. Since their route was planned later, the south end of the station had to be extensively rebuilt. From the new lower platform, staircases were built both directly to the entry floor and to the existing platform. This corridor is a serious bottleneck in the busy dual station. At the Marienplatz station, designed by Alexander von Branca, the S-Bahn lines S1-S8 are crossed, and due to the occupation and stadium traffic, it is often overloaded. The station is the busiest in the entire metro network. Therefore, and in view of the 2006 Football World Cup, the city council decided that "under its feet", directly under the town hall, two additional pedestrian tunnels should help equalize the crowd. The extension was inaugurated on 29 May 2006.

At the Sendlinger Tor, the U1 and U2 lines crossed. Above the already built 35 years ago, Lindwurmtunnel, is the Goetheplatz station, which was also partially built before 1941, is reached. In this section of the tunnel, the wall bulges for the originally planned overhead pylons as well as the markings on the walls from its use as an air raid shelter during the Second World War are still recognizable. The following Poccistraße station (near the former suburban train station Munich South) was subsequently installed between the tunnels already in operation and opened on 28 May 1978, just under three years after the remainder of the line opened. At the Implerstraße station, the U3 and U6 lines separate again, here there is also, in the opposite direction, a single-track branch to the plant Theresienwiese, over which the route of the U4 / U5 is reached.

=== South (U3) ===
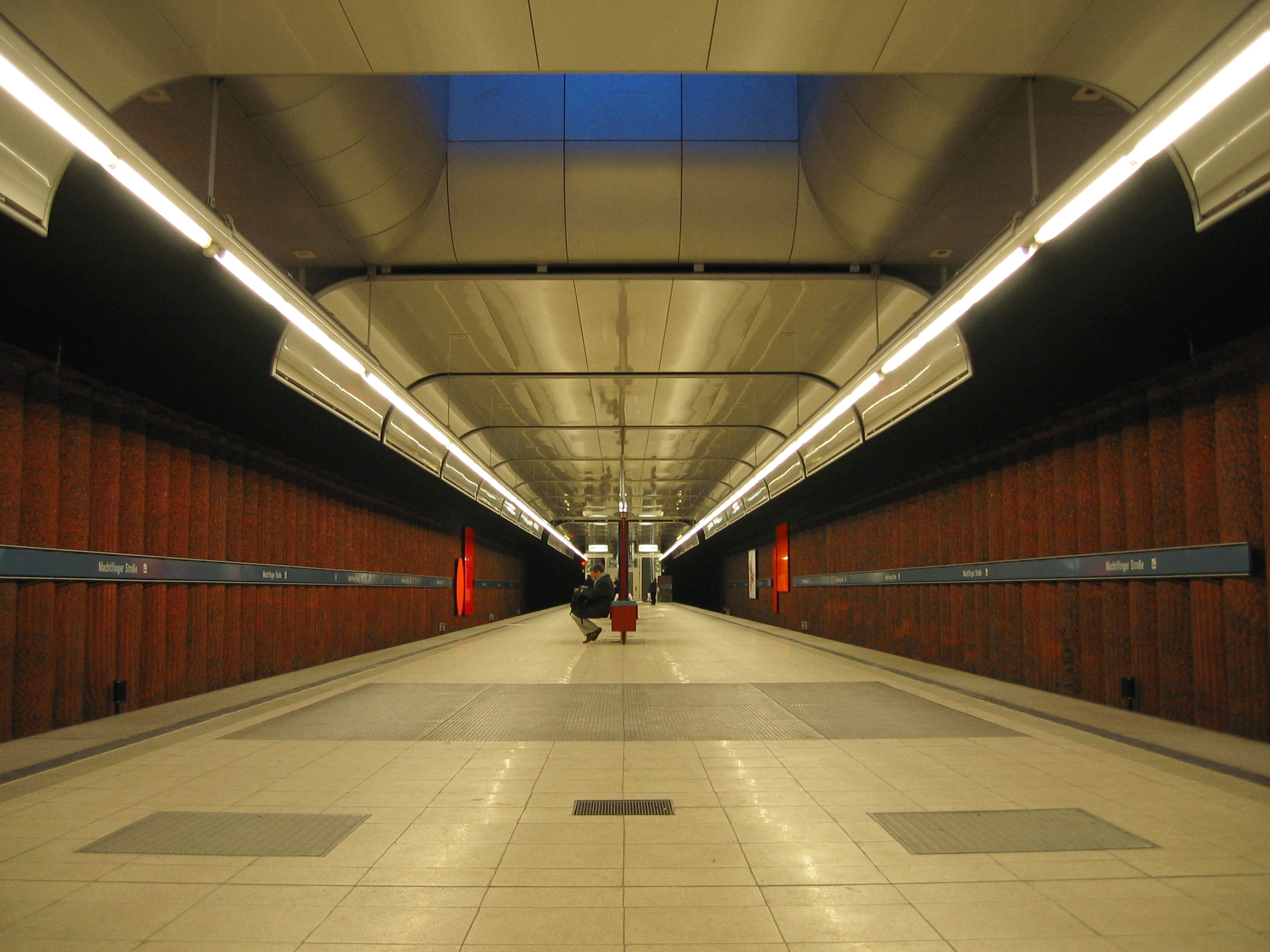
Machtlfinger Straße

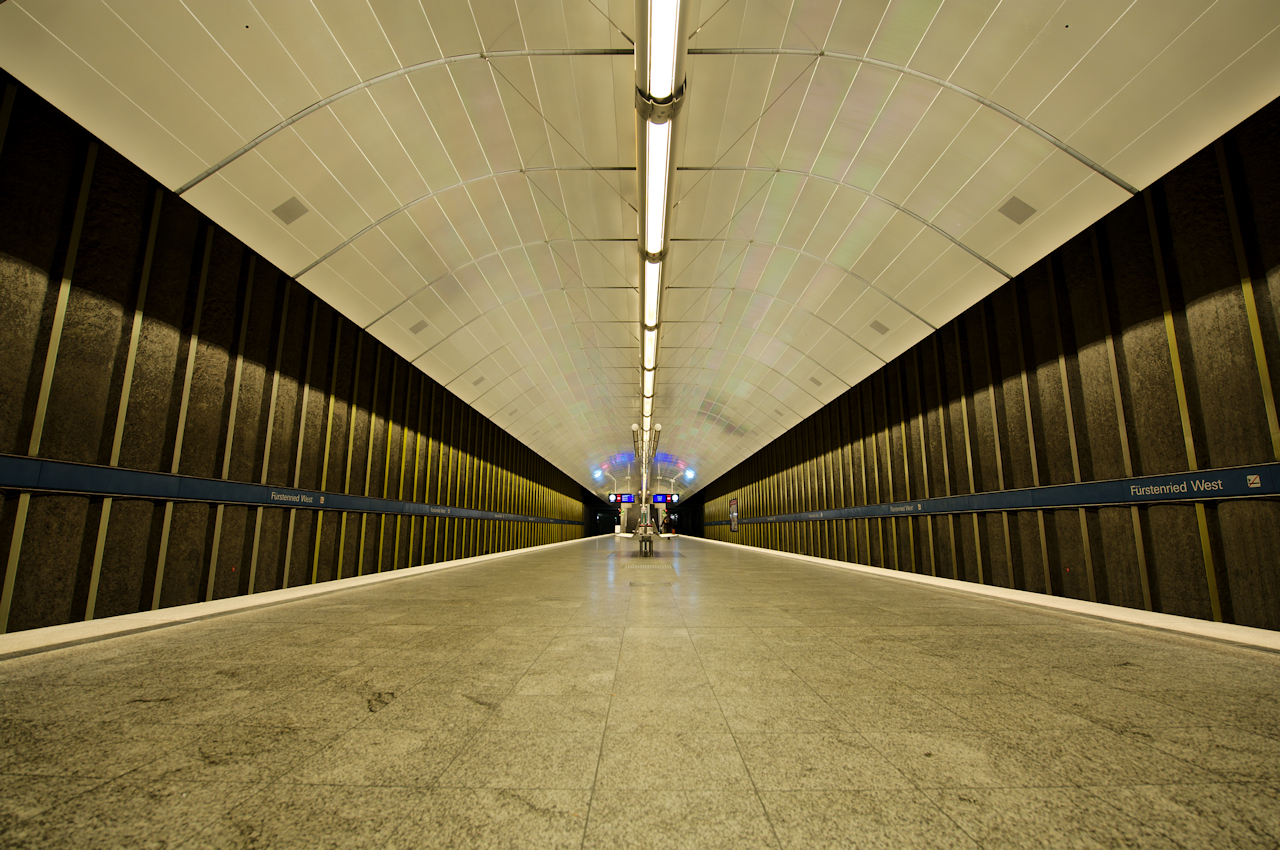
Fürstenried West: Southern endpoint of the U3

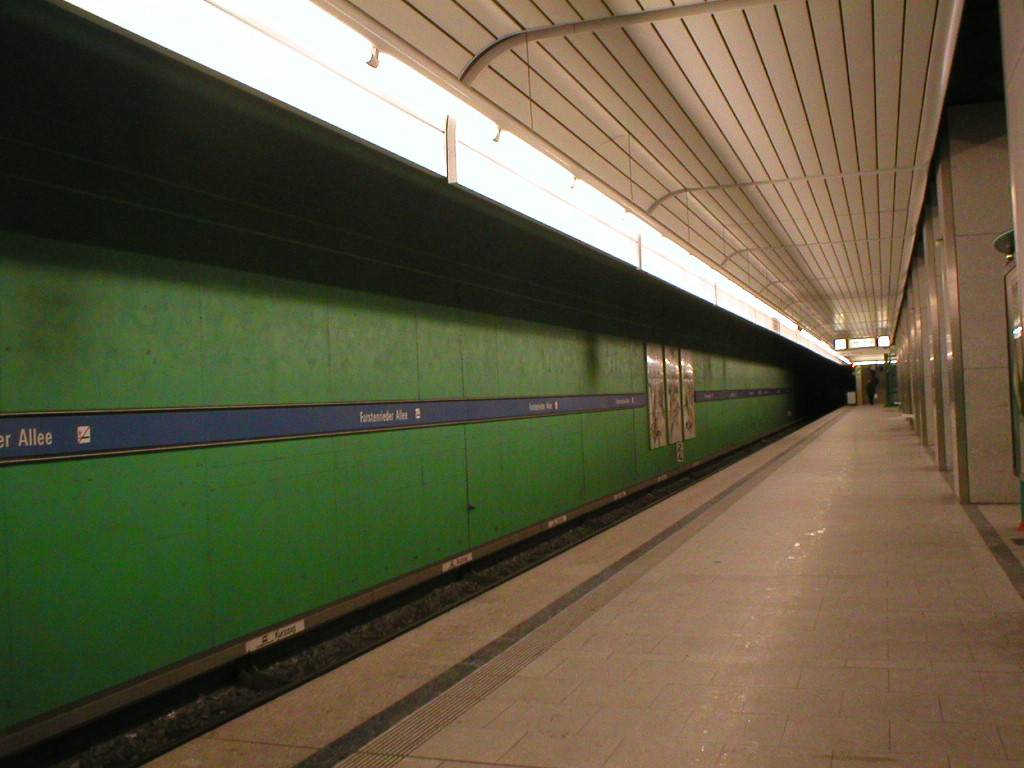
Forstenrieder Allee

From the three-track branching station Implerstraße, the U3 leads almost exactly to the south. The next station, Brudermühlstraße, was built together with the overlying Brudermühltunnel of the Middle Ring, which is why it lies relatively deep in the groundwater. An old millstone in the block level is a reminder of the tradition of the street. At the Thalkirchen (Tierpark) station, animal motifs, designed by Ricarda Dietz, on the tracks back walls give reference to the nearby Tierpark Hellabrunn. On the south side, a ramp leads from the underground station to the mezzanine level and continues towards the Isar and Zoo.

Climbing the banks of the Isar, a little less than 30 vertical meters, the U3 reaches the columnless Obersendling station, a point of connection to the Siemenswerke S-Bahn station. Obersendling was the first station in which the planners of the subway unit left the bored pile walls open as a design element, painted in reddish brown. The following station, Aidenbachstraße, is characterized by twelve broken mirror surfaces, which are arranged according to the center pillars. Similar to Obersendling, the bored pile walls were painted burgundy red at the now following Machtlfinger Straße station, and decorated with art objects from Rupprecht Geiger. A special feature of the not very low station is its two large skylights.

The next station, Forstenrieder Allee, is similar to the one on Aidenbachstraße, but shows pictures by the artist Helmut Pfeuffer. On Basler Straße, the cartoonist Ernst Hürlimann has immortalized himself in the form of a red devil, alluding to figures of the Basel Fasnacht. The elevator shaft also lets in a lot of daylight on the platform. At the end station, Fürstenried West, was the first use of a novel lighting concept, which distributes two-thirds of the light indirectly via large reflectors onto the platform.

=== South (U6) ===
Großhadern

Behind the Implerstraße underground station, the U6 line branches off to the west in a right turn. Before the station, the only operating section of the Munich subway branches off into the three-track operation Theresienwiese and further to the U-Bahn station Schwanthalerhöhe the U4 / U5.

At Harras, there is a connection to the S-Bahn S7 line and to the trains of the Bavarian Oberlandbahn (BOB). Some portions of the U6 end here. The following stops Partnachplatz, Westpark and Holzapfelkreuth, emerged as part of the IGA. Characteristic of these three stations are the color gradients on the walls.

In the further course of the route, the end station at the Klinikum Großhadern is reached via Haderner Stern and Grosshadern, whose access to the surface is visible in the form of two glass pyramids. The last three stations are the most elaborate of the U6. Walls, floors, ceilings and the lighting concept are precisely coordinated and artistically created.

== Operation ==
=== U3 ===
The U3 line of the Munich underground has 25 stations and is more than 20 km long. It runs from Moosach station, east to Münchner Freiheit, from there south to Thalkirchen, then turns west and ends in Fürstenried West.

=== U6 ===
The U6 line of the Munich underground has 26 stations and, at 27.4 km long, is the longest Munich subway line. It runs in a north–south-westerly direction from Garching-Forschungszentrum via Fröttmaning, Münchner Freiheit, Odeonsplatz, Marienplatz, Sendlinger Tor, Implerstraße and Harras to the Klinikum Großhadern.

The U6 operates as the only line weekdays outside rush hours, and on Saturdays during the day in a quicker tackt between Münchner Freiheit and Harras (every 3/7 minutes), in order to stay track with the U3, with a tackt timing of 3/3/4 minutes, in order to compensate the high number of passengers.

Currently (summer 2016), the C2 series is being tested on weekdays from 7 am, between Münchner Freiheit and Garching Forschungszentrum. This results in a 3/3/4-Minuten-Tackt between Münchner Freiheit and Fröttmaning, and a 4/6-minute tackt between Fröttmaning and Garching Forschungszentrum.

=== U8 ===
Since 15 December 2013, the U8 amplifier line runs on Saturdays from the Olympiazentrum via the Hauptbahnhof to Sendlinger Tor. From the Olympiazentrum to Scheidplatz, it runs parallel to the U3 and turns off at Scheidplatz onto the main line 2. Therefore, the already carried out for some time, Saturday rides between Olympiazentrum and Sendlinger Tor has its own line number. The line runs on a section of the U8 (now U2) already existing since 1980 to 1988, from Olympiazentrum via Sendlinger Tor to Neuperlach south.

== Planning ==
=== U3 (north): Untermenzing ===
An extension of the U3 in the north, via Moosach and further to the, opened in 2005, S-Bahn station Untermenzing, was in the traffic development plan 2006 of the city of Munich as a "corridor for network supplementation". In the long term, an extension to the Munich-Pasing station could be realized.

=== U6 (north): district of Freising ===
Since the northern end of the U6, the Garching-Forschungszentrum station, is already located directly on the border to the district of Freising, an extension to the north, to the S-Bahn stops Neufahrn, Eching or even the airport was required (see Regional Plan Munich 2004). In a feasibility study commissioned by MVG itself, an extension of the U6 to Neufahrner S-Bahn station was investigated. While the study showed, as expected, that these plans did not replace a rapid transit or express train connection between Munich Hauptbahnhof and the airport, it concluded that the networking of the U6 and S1 would bring many benefits. In addition to cutting back travel times to the airport from the U6 station "Universität", the accessibility of the Allianz Arena from the airport and from northern and eastern Bavaria and the connection between the Garching and Freising-Weihenstephan locations of the Technical University of Munich would be emphasized. The extension of the U6 to S1 is currently (as of 2017), again the subject of investigations to improve public transportation in the district of Munich.

=== U6 (south): Martinsried ===
The extension of the U6 in the south to Martinsried was decided on 20 July 2009 by the district of Munich. The 67 million euro expensive, approximately 900 meters long route, was originally going to go into operation in 2014/2015. However, the financing negotiations proved difficult. The Bavarian Cabinet gave its approval for the project in December 2014. The timetable foresees the start of construction for the end of 2016 and the commissioning for the end of 2020.

=== Renovations and Repairs ===
Since the 40-year-old Heidemann Bridge between the stations Freimann and Kieferngarten (northeast of the U6) had to be completely renovated, the trains between the stations Studentenstadt and Kieferngarten 2013 and 2014 were interrupted for 3 months. During this time, first the west, then the east side of the bridge were renewed. The other track had to be available for the accessibility of construction vehicles.

== Trivia ==
The line number comes from the tram line 6, which before the opening of the U6, served with a walkway from Freimann on Nordfriedhof, Odeonsplatz, Stachus, Sendlinger-Tor-Platz, Harras to Lorettoplatz, one of today's U6 similar operation area.

== See also ==
- Stammstrecke 2 (Munich U-Bahn)
- List of Munich U-Bahn stations
- Münchner Verkehrsgesellschaft
- Münchner Verkehrs- und Tarifverbund
