= Fröttmaning station =

Station of the Munich U-Bahn

Fröttmaning
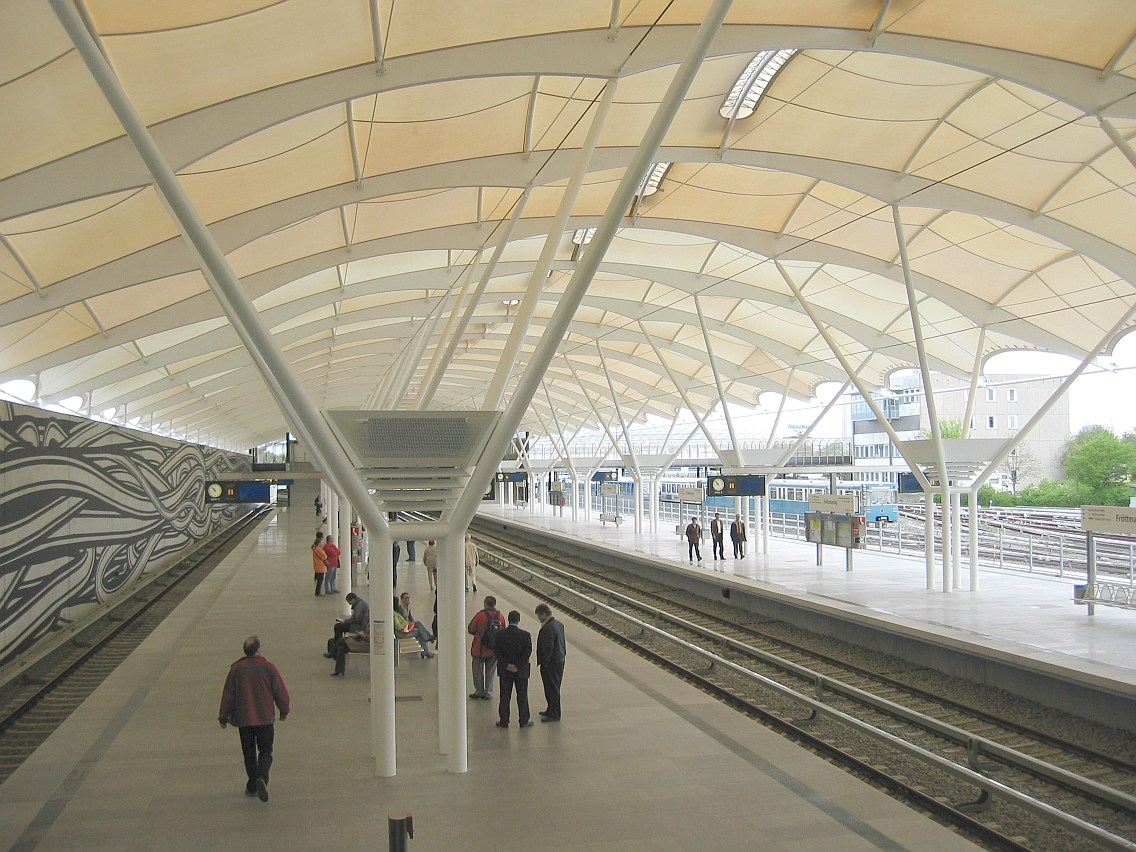

General information
- Location: Fröttmaning; Munich, Germany
- Coordinates: 48°12′43″N 11°37′00″E
- Platforms: 2 island platforms
- Tracks: 4

Construction
- Structure type: At grade
- Accessible: Yes

Other information
- Fare zone: : M and 1

History
- Opened: 30 June 1994

Services
Preceding station	Munich U-Bahn	Following station
Kieferngarten towards Klinikum Großhadern	U6	Garching-Hochbrück towards Garching-Forschungszentrum
Location

Fröttmaning is an U-Bahn station in the Freimann district of Munich on the U6 line of the Munich U-Bahn system. Located on Stammstrecke 1, it serves the Allianz Arena and was opened on 30 June 1994.

== History ==
In order to create a transfer option from private transport to public transport outside the city, the U6, which previously ended at the Kieferngarten subway station, was extended by one station to the north and a park-and-ride car park was built there at the same time, especially since the route to Garching-Hochbrück that had already been decided should run here anyway. On 30 June 1994, the station was opened with two tracks, approximately 50 metres (160 ft) south of its current location. Until the route extension to Hochbrück opened on 28 October 1995, Fröttmaning was the northern terminus of the U6. The commissioning of the Allianz Arena made it necessary, especially with a view to the 2006 FIFA World Cup, to demolish the old train station and build a completely new train station with the current one. This happened from 2002 to 2005. Only the southern of the two bridges over the technical base tracks, which ended in the middle of the platform at the old train station, was preserved. Both stations were planned by the architects Peter Bohn and Julia Mang-Bohn.

== Location and surroundings ==
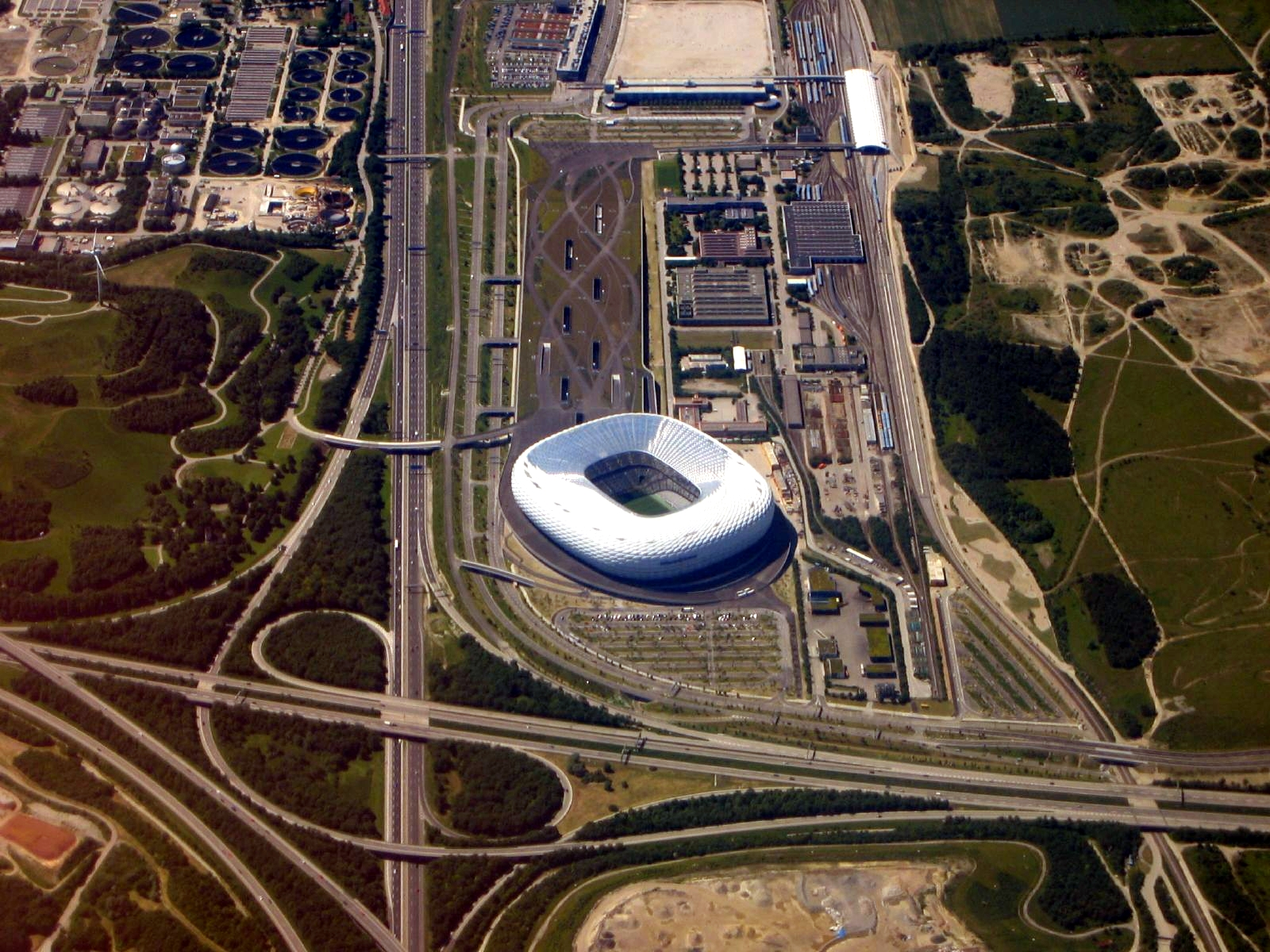
Aerial view of the Allianz Arena with the Fröttmaning U-Bahn station in the upper right part of the image (light roof)

The station is primarily known for connecting the Allianz Arena, which is located north of the station, to local public transport. The stadium is about a 10-15 minute walk from the subway station. On the other side of the tracks of the Fröttmaning Technical Base, which are directly next to the train station, is the park-and-ride parking garage, which was built at the same time as the station. To the west are the Fröttmaninger Heide and the Haidpark residential area, which was developed at this point due to its proximity to the subway station. The Holy Cross Church, the only relic of the defunct village of Fröttmaning, which gave the station its name, is located about 1.5 kilometres (0.93 mi) to the northeast.

The next stop towards the city center is the Kieferngarten underground station, 830 metres (2,720 ft) away. The tracks branch off to the technical base between these two stations. Towards the north, the subways cross under the Bundesautobahn 99 and leave the Munich area before reaching the Garching-Hochbrück subway station, 4,208 metres (13,806 ft) away, in the neighboring town of Garching bei München. No other neighboring train stations in the Munich subway network are so far apart. Marienplatz train station, centrally located in Munich, is around 9 kilometres (5.6 mi) and a 17-minute drive away. Location and Surroundings:

== Station Complex ==
=== Construction ===
To accommodate the large number of visitors to the football matches at Allianz Arena, the station has four tracks with two central platforms. During normal operations, the two outer tracks are used for through traffic, and the middle tracks are used for turning. Both platforms are connected at their southern ends by escalators, fixed stairs, and an elevator each to a bridge that leads from Fröttmaninger Heide over the tracks of the technical base to the park-and-ride garage on Hans-Jensen-Weg. A second bridge to the north, accessible via fixed stairs, leads to the esplanade in front of the football stadium.

=== Design ===
The station is completely covered by a translucent membrane mounted on a tree-like structure. The platforms are paved with granite slabs and separated by a fence between the tracks. On the west side, a concrete wall separates the station from the Fröttmaninger Heide, which is painted with a work of art by Peter Kogler.

== Traffic ==
The U6 line runs from the station every ten minutes, and Munich city center can be reached in about 15 minutes. During rush hour, additional trains run between Fröttmaning and the Großhadern Hospital, resulting in a five-minute service towards the city center. There are no transfer options to other MVV public transport services. There is a bus terminal beneath the park-and-ride car park, where long-distance bus lines run. Since the opening of the Allianz Arena, the station has also been represented on passenger information boards with a football symbol.

Line	Route
U6	Garching-Forschungszentrum – Garching – Garching-Hochbrück – Fröttmaning – Kieferngarten – Freimann – Studentenstadt – Alte Heide – Nordfriedhof – Dietlindenstraße – Münchner Freiheit – Giselastraße – Universität – Odeonsplatz – Marienplatz – Sendlinger Tor – Goetheplatz – Poccistraße – Implerstraße – Harras – Partnachplatz – Westpark – Holzapfelkreuth – Haderner Stern – Großhadern – Klinikum Großhadern

== Notable places nearby ==
- Allianz Arena

== See also ==
- List of Munich U-Bahn stations
