= Kieferngarten station =

Station of the Munich U-Bahn

Kieferngarten
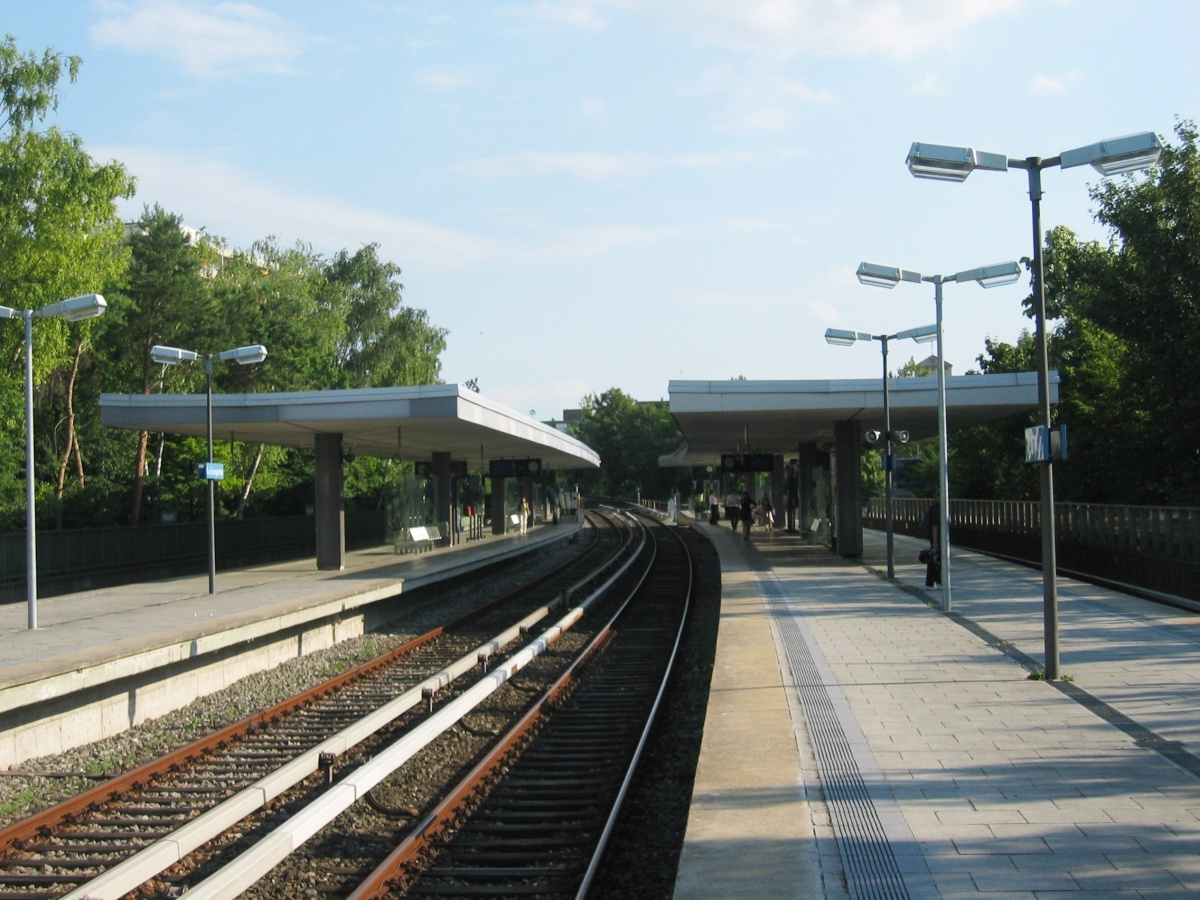

General information
- Location: Schwabing-Freimann; Munich, Germany
- Coordinates: 48°12′13″N 11°36′48″E
- Platforms: 2 island platforms
- Tracks: 4
- Connections: MVV buses

Construction
- Structure type: At grade
- Accessible: Yes

Other information
- Fare zone: : M and 1

History
- Opened: 19 October 1971

Services
| Preceding station | Munich U-Bahn | Following station |
|---|---|---|
| Freimann towards Klinikum Großhadern | U6 | Fröttmaning towards Garching-Forschungszentrum |
Location
- Location within Bavaria Location within Germany Location within Europe

Kieferngarten is an U-Bahn station in Munich on the U6. It was the terminus of the first section of the U-Bahn to be built, opening on 19 October 1971.
