= Garching-Hochbrück station =

Station of the Munich U-Bahn

Garching-Hochbrück
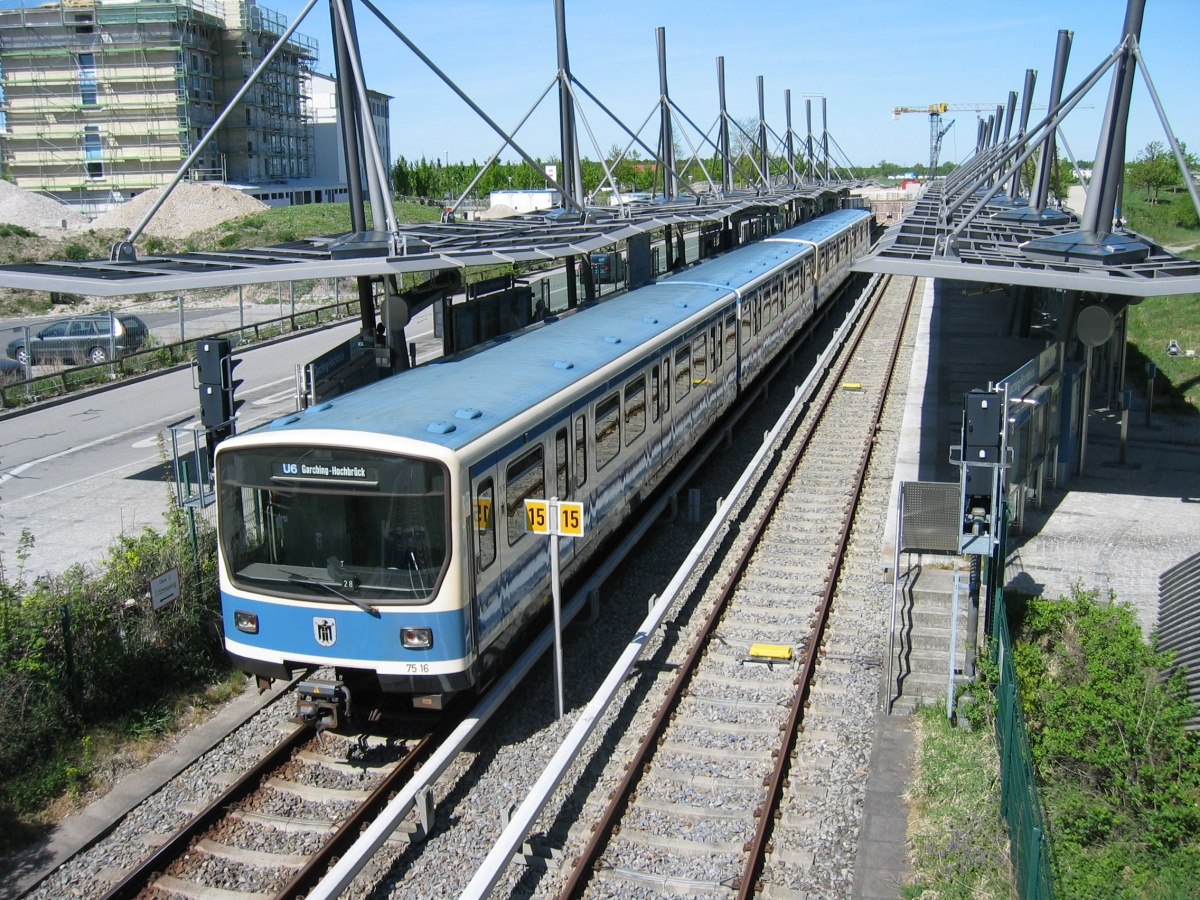

General information
- Location: Hochbrück; Bavaria, Germany
- Coordinates: 48°14′50″N 11°37′52″E
- Connections: MVV buses

Construction
- Structure type: At grade
- Accessible: Yes

Other information
- Fare zone: : 1 and 2

History
- Opened: 28 October 1995

Services
Preceding station	Munich U-Bahn	Following station
Fröttmaning towards Klinikum Großhadern	U6	Garching towards Garching-Forschungszentrum
Location

Garching-Hochbrück is a Munich U-Bahn station in Hochbrück on the U6. It opened on October 28, 1995.

== See also ==
- List of Munich U-Bahn stations
