= Bonner Platz (Munich) =

Public square in Munich, Germany

Coordinates: 48°10′01″N 11°34′43″E

Bonner Platz, 1906 named after the city of Bonn, is a square in the Schwabing district of Munich, in the Schwabing-West quarter. The underground station of the same name Bonner Platz of the line U3 is located here.

The following streets flows into the square (clockwise): from the west the Karl-Theodor-Straße, from the north the Bonner Straße, from the North East corner of the square to the east the Rheinstraße, from the South East Corner of the square to the east Karl-Theodor-Straße and to the south Viktoriastraße. The square is crossed diagonally by the western Karl-Theodor-Straße and the Rheinstraße, which merge into each other here and belong to the busy city tangent Dietlindenstraße - Potsdamer Straße - Rheinstraße - Karl-Theodor-Straße - Ackermannstraße. In contrast, the eastern Karl-Theodor-Straße is of secondary importance; it crosses the aforementioned through road and becomes Bonner Straße. In addition, there are narrow car park access roads on the northern, eastern and southern sides.

As a result of the traffic routing described, the majority of the square is occupied by traffic areas. There are also parking spaces and two traffic islands (meadow with some trees).

== History ==
Originally, the square was designed as a northern bulge of the continuous Karl-Theodor-Straße. West-Eastern traffic was limited to the area between Schleißheimer Straße and Ungererstraße; to the west of this was the drill ground Oberwiesenfeld, to the east the still undivided Englischer Garten. Rheinstraße only became a through road after the Second World War with the construction of the Mittlerer Ring through the Englischer Garten.
