= Freimann station =

Station of the Munich U-Bahn

Freimann
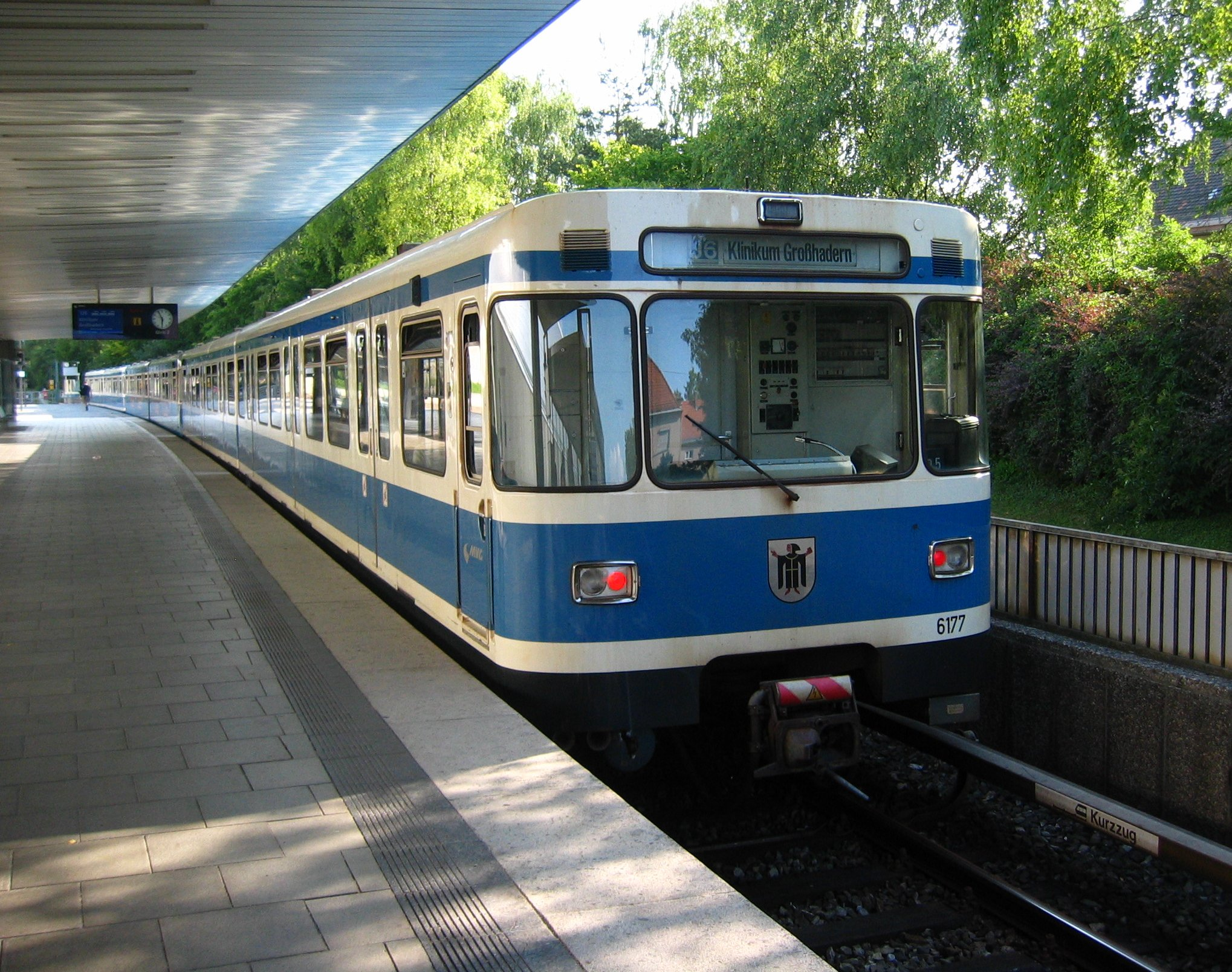

General information
- Location: Schwabing-Freimann; Munich, Germany
- Coordinates: 48°11′31″N 11°36′52″E
- Platforms: Island platform
- Tracks: 2

Construction
- Structure type: At grade
- Accessible: Yes

Other information
- Fare zone: : M and 1

Services
Preceding station	Munich U-Bahn	Following station
Studentenstadt towards Klinikum Großhadern	U6	Kieferngarten towards Garching-Forschungszentrum
Location

Freimann is a railway station in the German city of Munich. It is part of the Munich U-Bahn network and lies on the U6 line in the borough of Schwabing-Freimann.

== Notable places nearby ==
- Zenith
