= Allianz Arena =

Stadium in Munich, Germany

Coordinates: 48°13′08″N 11°37′29″E

- "Schlauchboot" ("dinghy"); Munich Football Arena (UEFA competitions)

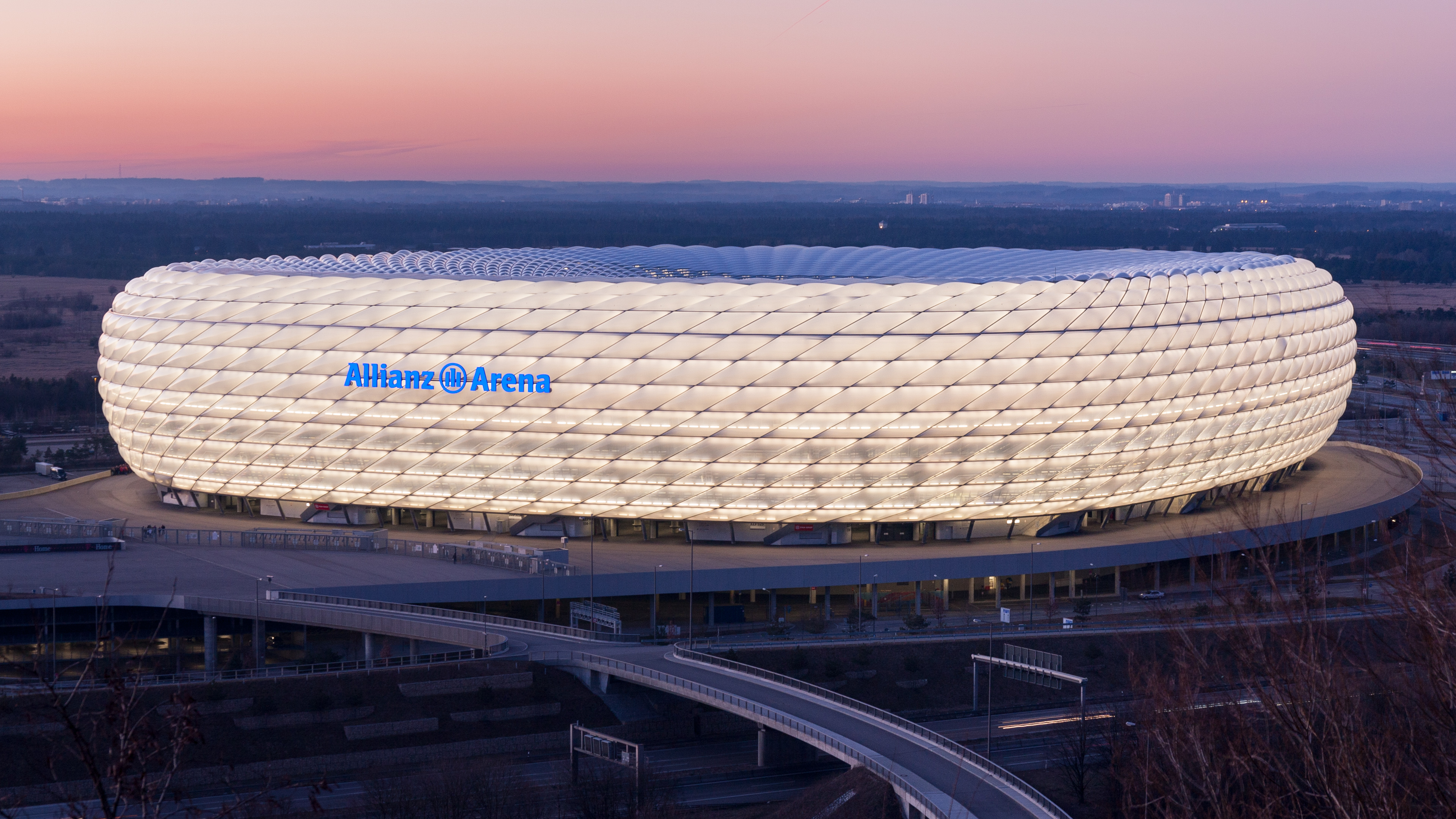
- UEFA
- Interactive map of Allianz Arena
- Address: Franz-Beckenbauer-Platz 5, 80939
- Location: Munich, Bavaria, Germany
- Owner: Allianz Arena München Stadion GmbH
- Operator: Allianz Arena München Stadion GmbH
- Capacity: 75,024 (domestic matches); 70,000 (international and European matches); Capacity history; 66,000 (2005); 69,901 (2006–2012); 71,137 (2012–2013); 71,437 (2013–2015); 75,024 (as of 2024)
- Executive suites: 106
- Surface: Hybrid grass
- Field size: 105 m × 68 m (114.8 yd × 74.4 yd)
- Public transit: at Fröttmaning

Construction
- Groundbreaking: 21 October 2002; 24 years ago
- Built: 2003–2005
- Opened: 30 May 2005; 21 years ago
- Cost: €340 million
- Architects: Herzog & de Meuron; Arup
- Structural engineer: Arup]

Tenants
- Bayern Munich (2005–present); 1860 Munich (2005–2017); Germany national football team (selected matches); Major sporting events hosted; 2006 FIFA World Cup; 2012 UEFA Champions League final; UEFA Euro 2024; 2025 UEFA Champions League final; 2025 UEFA Nations League final; 2028 UEFA Champions League final; UEFA Women's Euro 2029; UEFA Women's Euro 2029 final

Website
- allianz-arena.com

Allianz Arena (German: [aˈli̯ants ʔaˌʁeːna]; known as Munich Football Arena for UEFA competitions) is a football stadium in Munich, Germany, with a 70,000 seating capacity for international matches and 75,000 for domestic matches. Widely known for its exterior of inflated ETFE plastic panels, it is the first stadium in the world with a full colour changing exterior. Located at Franz-Beckenbauer-Platz 5 at the northern edge of Munich's Schwabing-Freimann borough on the Fröttmaning Heath, it is the second-largest stadium in Germany behind the Westfalenstadion in Dortmund.

Bayern Munich have played their home games at the Allianz Arena since the start of the 2005–06 season. The club had previously played their home games at the Munich Olympic Stadium since 1972. 1860 Munich previously had a 50 per cent share in the stadium, but, in 2006, sold this to Bayern for €11m to help resolve a serious financial crisis that saw 1860 facing bankruptcy. The arrangement allowed 1860 Munich to play at the stadium while retaining no ownership until 2025. However, in July 2017 Bayern terminated the rental contract with 1860, making themselves the sole tenants of the stadium.

The large locally based financial services provider Allianz purchased the naming rights to the stadium for 30 years. However, this name cannot be used when hosting FIFA and UEFA events, since these governing bodies have policies forbidding corporate sponsorship from companies that are not official tournament partners. During the 2006 FIFA World Cup, the stadium was referred to as FIFA WM-Stadion München (FIFA World Cup Stadium, Munich). In UEFA club, Nations League and international matches, it is known as the Fußball Arena München [ˈfuːsbal ʔaˌʁeːna ˈmʏnçn̩] (Football Arena Munich), and it hosted the 2012 and the 2025 Champions League Finals, moved from 2023 as well as matches during UEFA Euro 2024. Since 2012, the museum of Bayern Munich, FC Bayern Erlebniswelt, has been located inside the Allianz Arena.

In 2022, it hosted a first regular season National Football League (NFL) American football game played in Germany as part of the NFL International Series.

== Design ==
=== Capacity ===
Effective with the city's approval of modifications that was granted 16 January 2006, the legal capacity of the stadium increased from 69,000 to 71,000 spectators (including standing room). The lower tier can seat up to 20,000, the middle tier up to 24,000, and the upper tier up to 22,000. 10,400 of the seats in the lower tier corners can be converted to standing room to allow an additional 3,120 spectators. The total capacity includes 2,000 business seats, 400 seats for the press, 106 luxury boxes with seating for up to 174, and 165 berths for wheelchairs and the like. From the second half of the 2005–06 Bundesliga season, the arena was able to accommodate 69,901 spectators at league and DFB-Pokal games, but because of UEFA regulations, the capacity remained at 66,000 seats for UEFA Champions League and UEFA Cup games. Bayern Munich limited capacity during their league and cup games to 69,000. The partial roof covers all seats, although winds can still blow rain onto some of them. Prior to the 2012–13 season, Bayern Munich announced that capacity had been increased to 71,000 for domestic matches and 68,000 for UEFA matches, with the addition of 2,000 seats in the upper tier of the arena.

Allianz Arena also offers three-day-care centres and a fan shop, the FC Bayern Munich Megastore. Merchandise is offered at stands all along the inside of the exterior wall inside the area behind the seats. Numerous restaurants and fast-food establishments are also located around the stadium.

There are four team locker rooms (one each for the two home teams and their respective opponents), four coaches' locker rooms, and two locker rooms for referees. Two areas are provided where athletes can warm up (approx. 110 m^{2} each). There are also 550 toilets and 190 monitors in the arena.

On 28 April 2013, FC Bayern announced it would be selling 300 more tickets in the Südkurve starting with the 2013–14 Bundesliga season.

On 21 January 2014, Karl-Heinz Rummenigge declared that FC Bayern was discussing a further expansion of the Allianz Arena. About 2,000 new seats were to be installed in the upper tier and about 2,000 more tickets in the Nord- and Südkurve. In August 2014, it was reported that the capacity expansion was completed leading to a new maximum capacity of 75,024 in the Bundesliga and 69,334 in international matches. Approval was given in January 2015 to expand the stadium's capacity to 75,000 for Bundesliga Games and 70,000 for games in the Champions League.

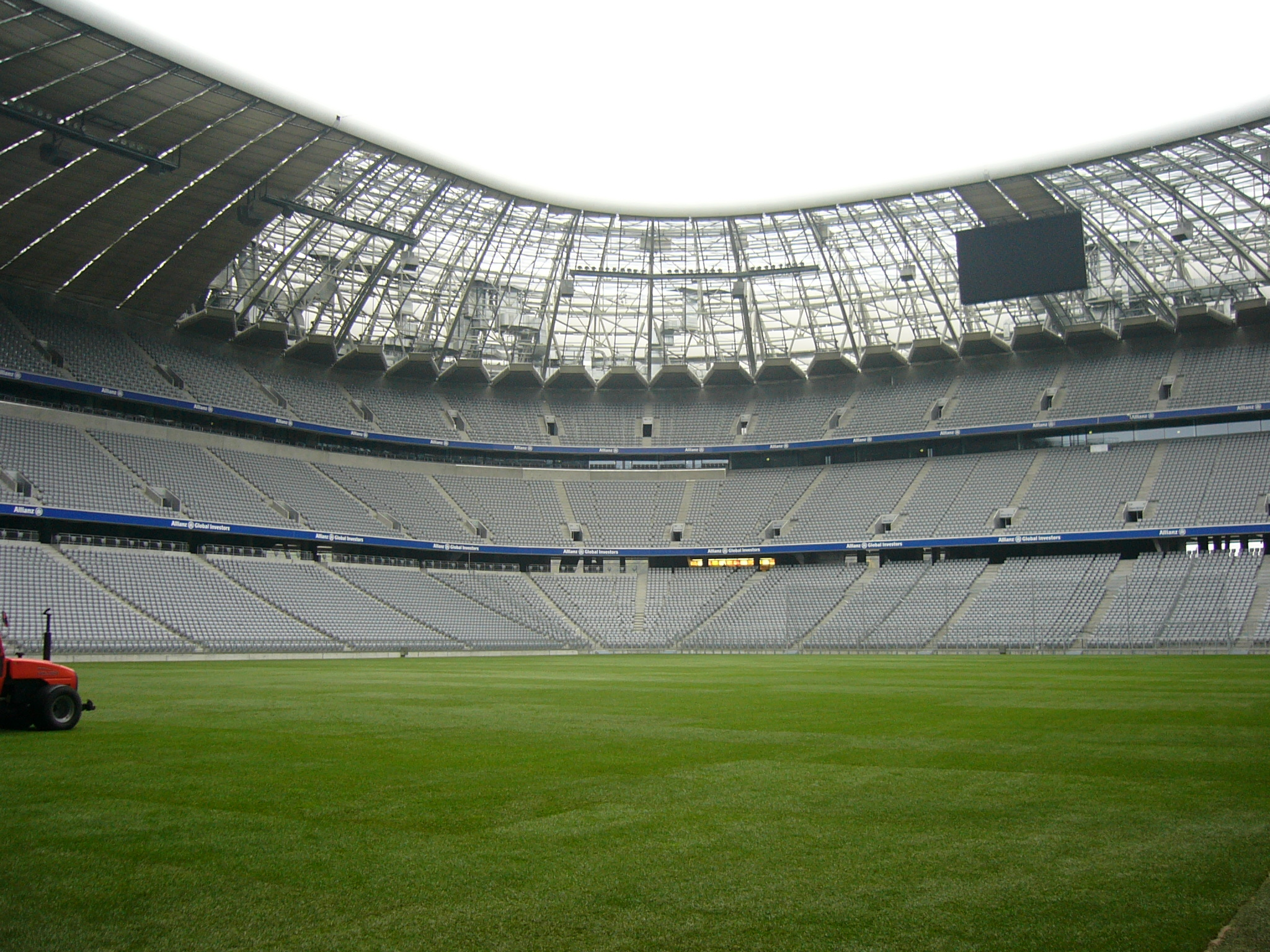
Part of Allianz Arena roof's sun-shade blinds rolled open

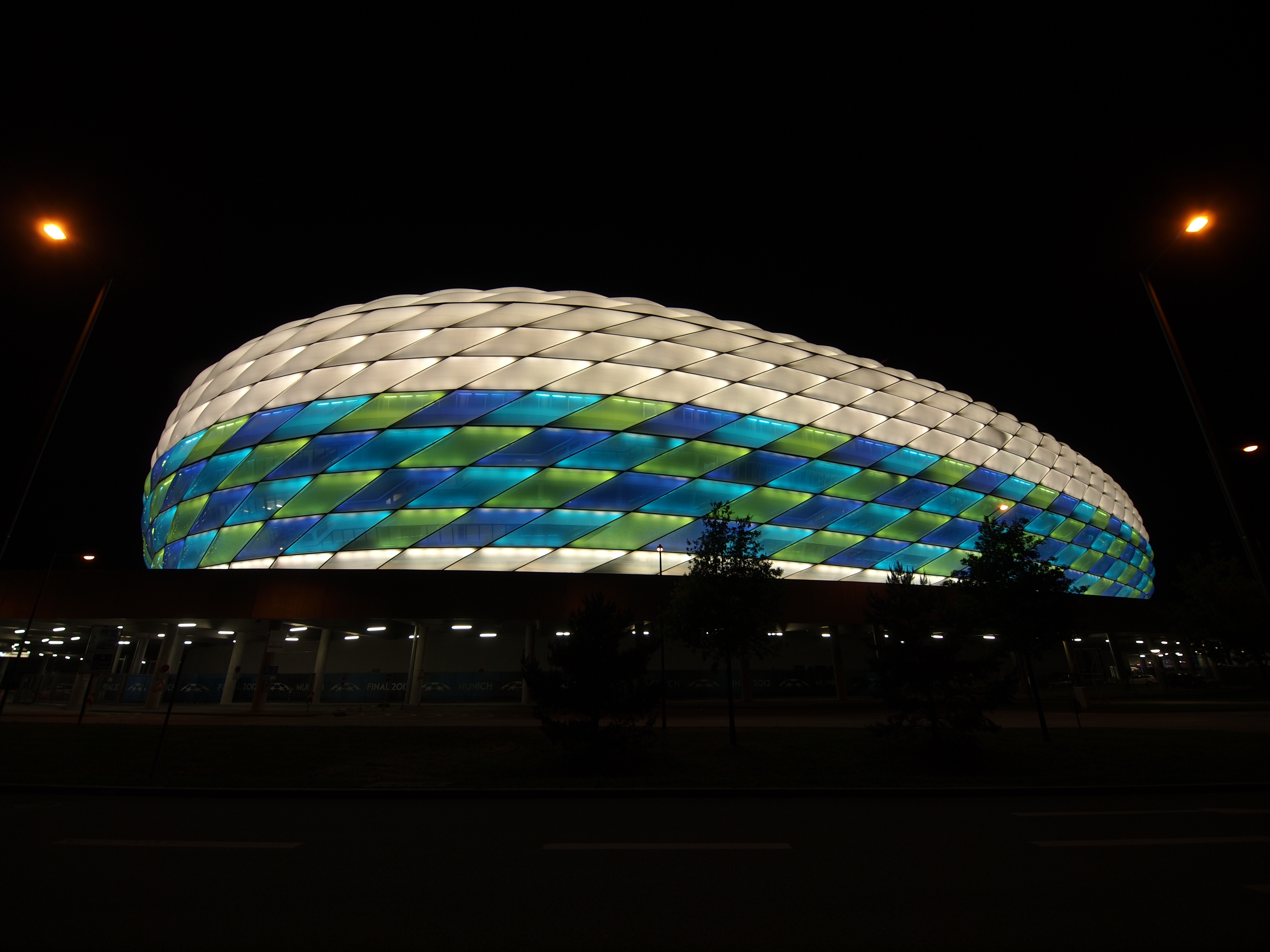
Illumination during the 2012 UEFA Champions League final

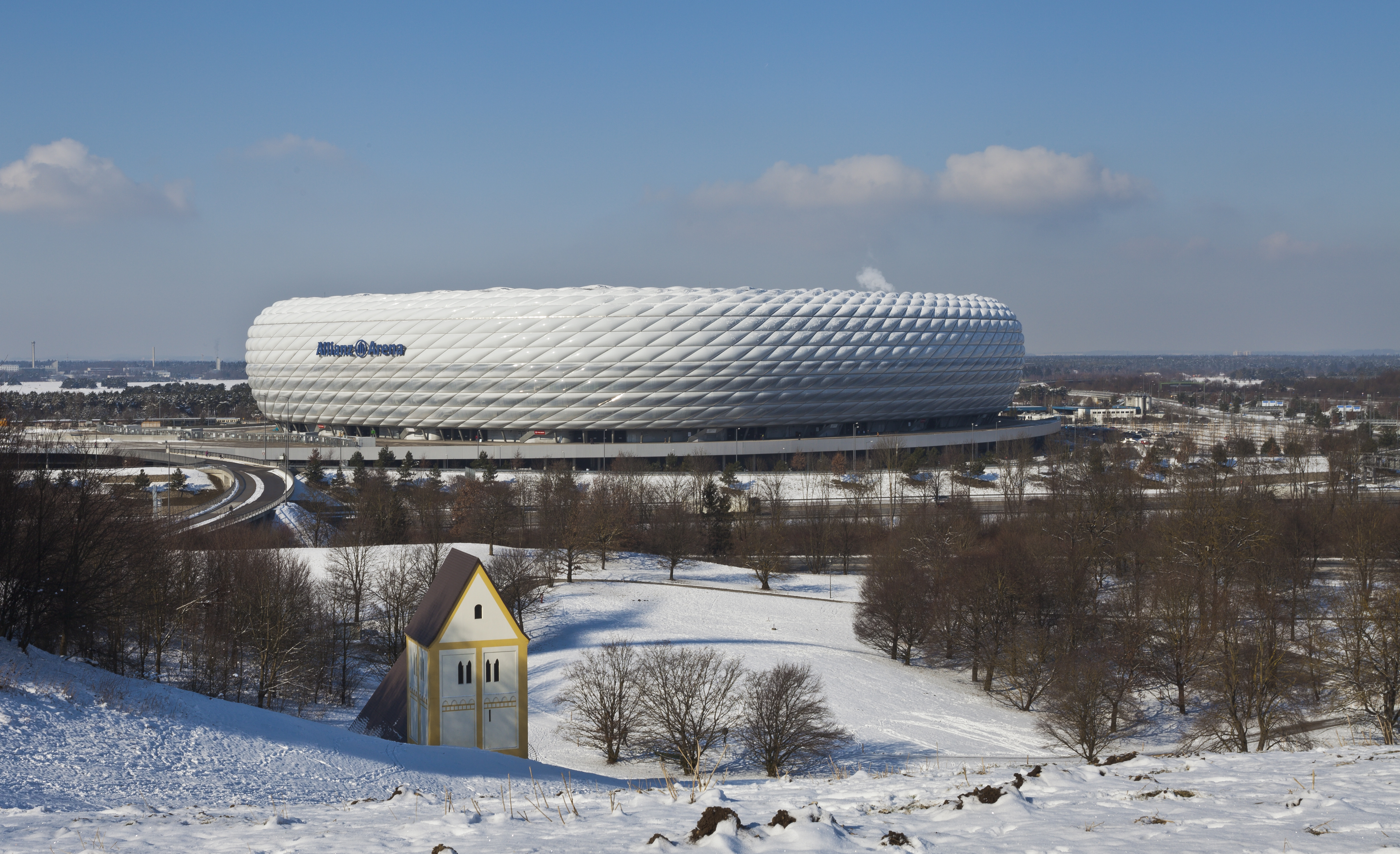
Allianz Arena with the Holy Cross Church, the oldest church in Munich

=== Construction ===
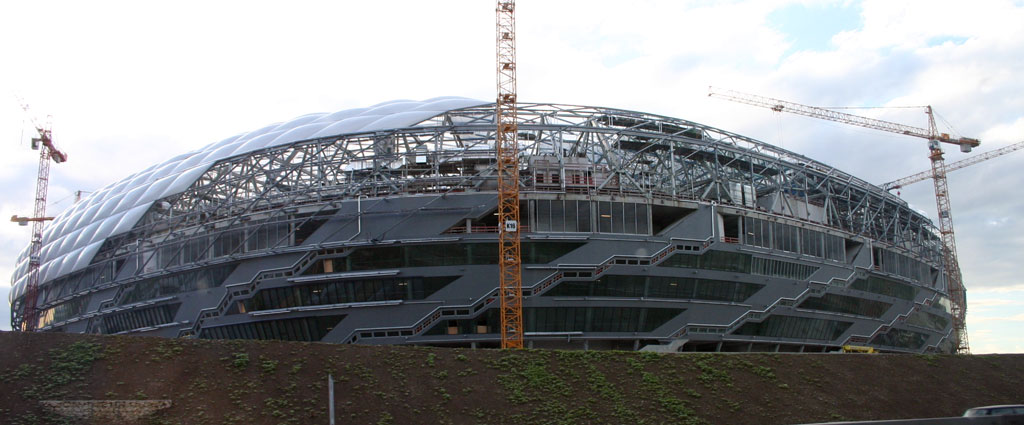
Allianz Arena under construction (August 2004)

The stadium construction began on 21 October 2002 and it was officially opened on 30 May 2005. The primary designers are architects Herzog & de Meuron. The stadium is designed so that the main entrance to the stadium would be from an elevated esplanade separated from the parking space consisting of Europe's biggest underground car park. The roof of the stadium has built-in roller blinds which may be drawn back and forth during games to provide protection from the sun.

- Total concrete used during stadium construction: 120,000 m^{3}
- Total concrete used for the parking garage: 85,000 m^{3}
- Total steel used during stadium construction: 22,000 tonnes
- Total steel used for the parking garage: 14,000 tonnes

=== Luminous exterior ===
The arena facade is constructed of 2,760 ETFE-foil air panels that are kept inflated with dry air to a differential pressure of 3.5 Pa. The panels appear white from far away but when examined closely, there are little dots on the panels. When viewed from far away, the eye combines the dots and sees white. When viewed close up however, it is possible to see through the foil. The foil has a thickness of 0.2 mm. Each panel can be independently lit with white, red, or blue light. The panels are lit for each game with the colours of the respective home team—red for Bayern Munich, blue for TSV and white for the Germany national team. White is also used when the stadium is a neutral venue, like the 2012 UEFA Champions League final. Other colours or multicolour or interchanging lighting schemes are theoretically possible, but the Munich Police strongly insists on using a single-colour lighting scheme due to several car accidents on the nearby A9 Autobahn with drivers being distracted by the changing lights.

Allianz Arena's innovative stadium-facade lighting concept has been subsequently adopted in other recently built venues, like MetLife Stadium in New Jersey, which lights up in blue for the National Football League's Giants and green for the Jets. With electricity costs for the light of about €50 (US$75) per hour, the construction emits enough light that, on clear nights, the stadium can easily be spotted from Austrian mountain tops, e.g. from a distance of 50 miles (80 km).

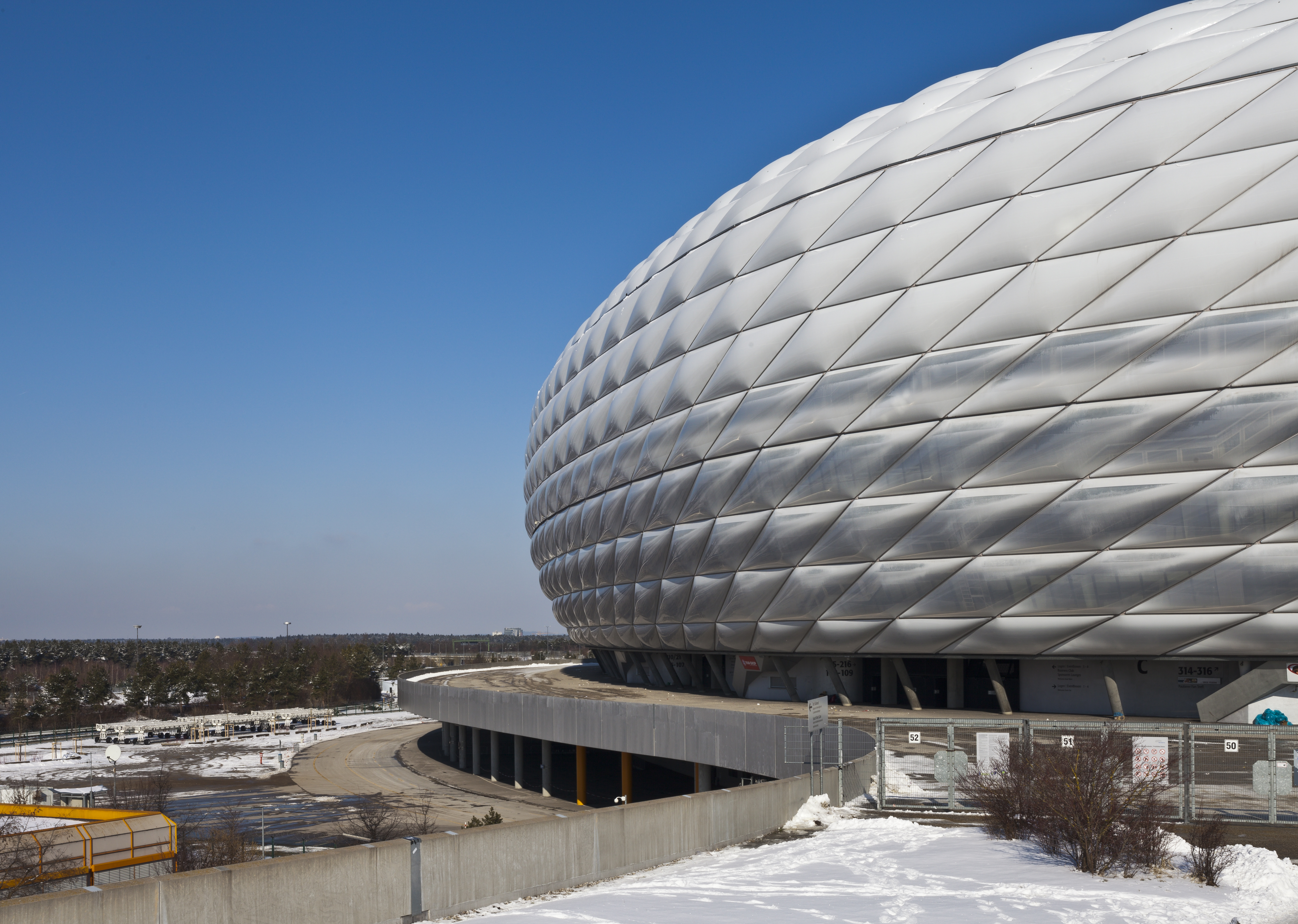
Allianz Arena

=== Transport ===
Patrons may park their cars in Europe's largest parking structure, comprising four four-storey parking garages with 9,800 parking places. In addition, 1,200 places were built into the first two tiers of the arena, 350 places are available for buses (240 at the north end, and 110 at the south entrance), and 130 more spots are reserved for those with disabilities.

The stadium is located next to the Fröttmaning U-Bahn station. This is on the U6 line of the Munich U-Bahn.

=== Surroundings ===
From the subway station just south of the arena, visitors approach the stadium through a park that was designed to disentangle and guide them to the entrance. An esplanade rises gradually from ground level at the subway station entrance, practically building the parking garage's cover, to the entrance level of the stadium. On the other side of the Autobahn, the Fröttmaning Hill with its windmill affords a marvellous view on the stadium. Also the Romanesque Heilig-Kreuz-Kirche, the oldest structure on the area of the City of Munich designed to serve religious purposes, is located there together with its copy, an artwork in concrete as a reminder for the village of Fröttmaning which disappeared with the construction of the Autobahn.

=== Owners ===
The arena was commissioned by the Allianz Arena München Stadion GmbH, founded in 2001, and was owned in equal parts by the two football clubs that called it home. The GmbH's CEO was Karl-Heinz Wildmoser Jr. until the unravelling of the stadium corruption affair (see below). Since then, Bernd Rauch, Peter Kerspe, and Walter Leidecker have led the company. In April 2006, FC Bayern Munich bought out TSV 1860 Munich's 50 per cent share in the arena for a reported €11 million. 1860 managing director Stefan Ziffzer stated that the deal prevented insolvency for the club. The terms of the agreement gave 1860 the right to buy back their 50 per cent share of the arena for the price of sale plus interest anytime before June 2010. In November 2007, 1860 Munich resigned that right. In advance, the income of two friendly-games both clubs shared equally instead of having that money going to Allianz Arena GmbH. Due to 1860 Munich's financial turbulence, Bayern Munich took over all the shares and owns 100 per cent of the Allianz Arena.

=== Name ===
Allianz paid significant sums for the right to lend its name to the stadium for a duration of 30 years. However, Allianz is not a sponsor for UEFA and FIFA competitions, and for this reason, the logo is covered during Champions League games, and was removed during the 2006 FIFA World Cup and UEFA Euro 2024.

=== Cost ===
The cost of the construction itself ran to €286 million, but financing costs raised that figure to a total of €340 million. In addition, the city and State incurred approximately €210 million for area development and infrastructure improvements.

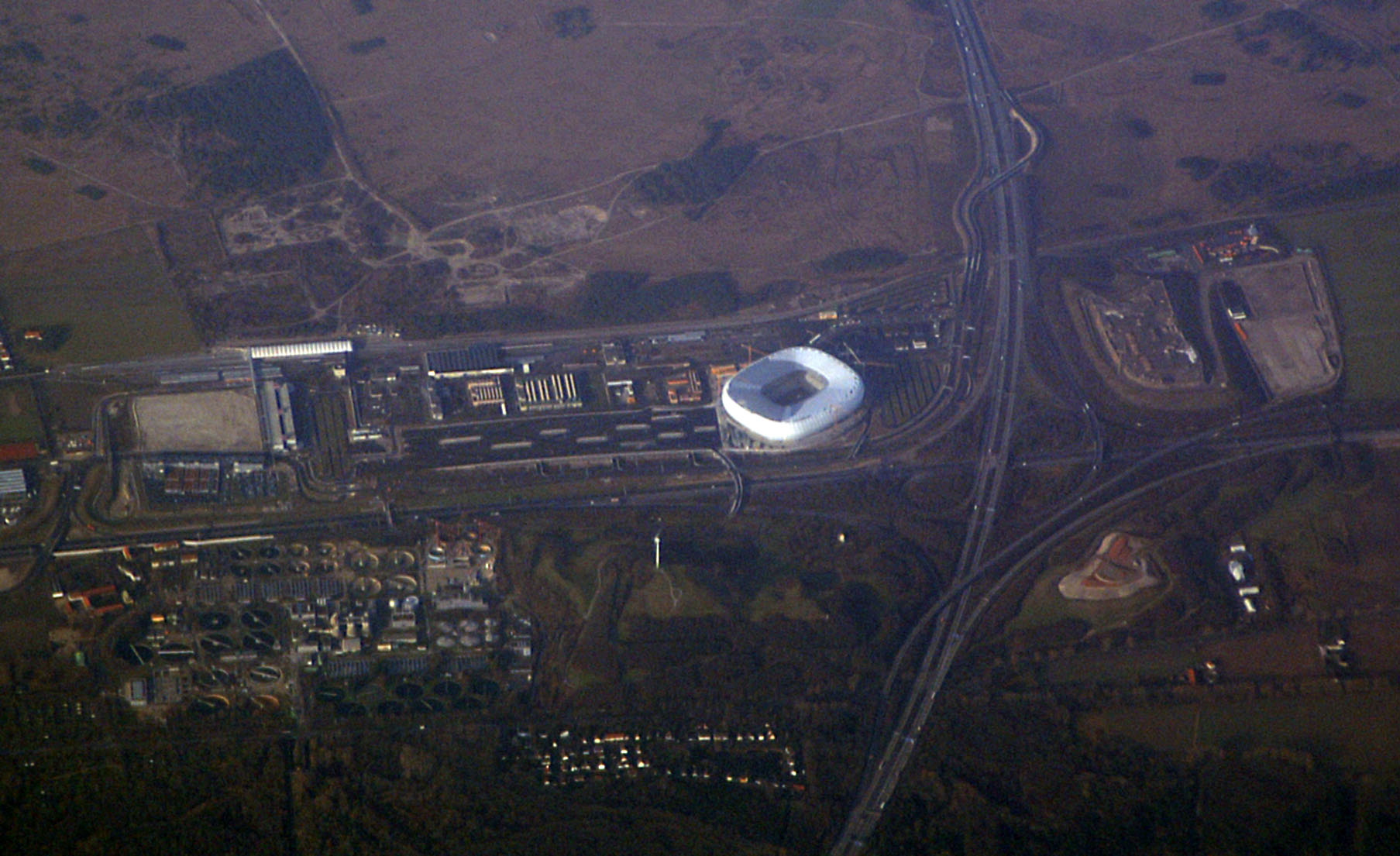
Aerial photo of Allianz Arena with surrounding area, shortly before construction was complete (January 2005)

== History ==
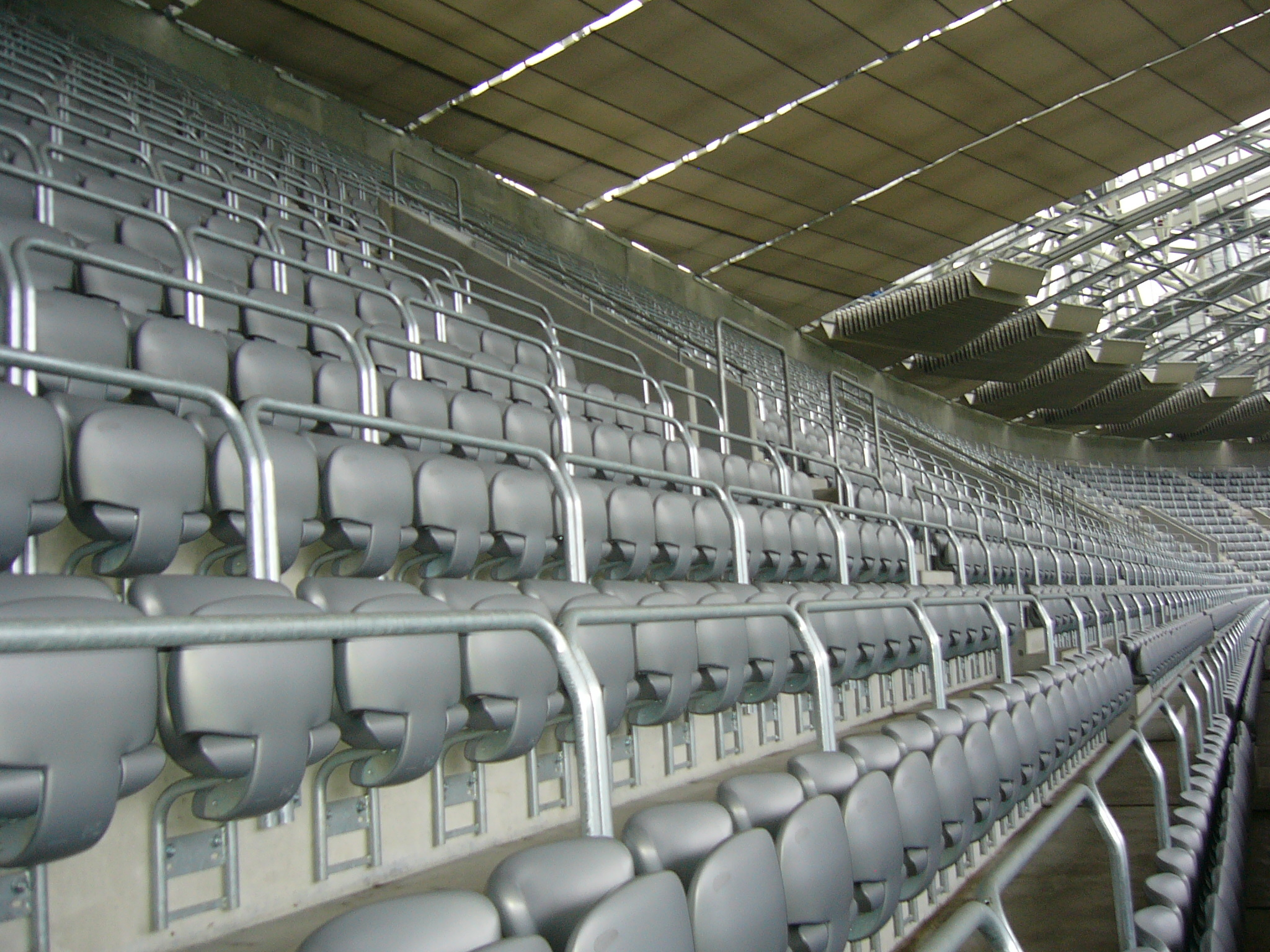
Seating area of the Allianz Arena

On 21 October 2002, voters went to the polls to determine whether a new stadium should be built in this location and whether the city of Munich should provide the necessary infrastructure. About two-thirds of the voters decided in favor of the proposition. An alternative to constructing the new arena had been a major reconstruction of the Olympic Stadium but this option had been refused by its architect Günther Behnisch.

Swiss architect firm Herzog & de Meuron then developed the concept of the stadium with a see-through exterior made of ETFE-foil panels that can be lit from the inside and are self-cleaning. Construction started in late 2002 and was completed by the end of April 2005.

The Fröttmaning and Marienplatz stations of the subway line U6 were expanded and improved in conjunction with the arena construction. The Fröttmaning subway stations platforms were moved slightly southwards and expanded from two to four tracks, while the Marienplatz U-Bahn station was outfitted with additional pedestrian connector tunnels running parallel to the subway tracks, which lead towards the S-Bahn portion of the station, lessening congestion among passengers making connections to the Munich S-Bahn. To be able to handle the additional traffic load, the Autobahn A9 was expanded to three and four lanes in each direction and another exit was added to the A99 north of the arena.

On 19 May 2012, the 2012 UEFA Champions League final was held at the Allianz Arena. Bayern Munich, who were drawn as home team, was set to play against Chelsea. Chelsea won on penalties after the game had tied 1–1 after regulation and extra time. Bastian Schweinsteiger's penalty hit Petr Čech's left post, and Didier Drogba scored the winning penalty. On 25 May 2012, Bayern opened a museum about its history, FC Bayern Erlebniswelt, inside the Allianz Arena.

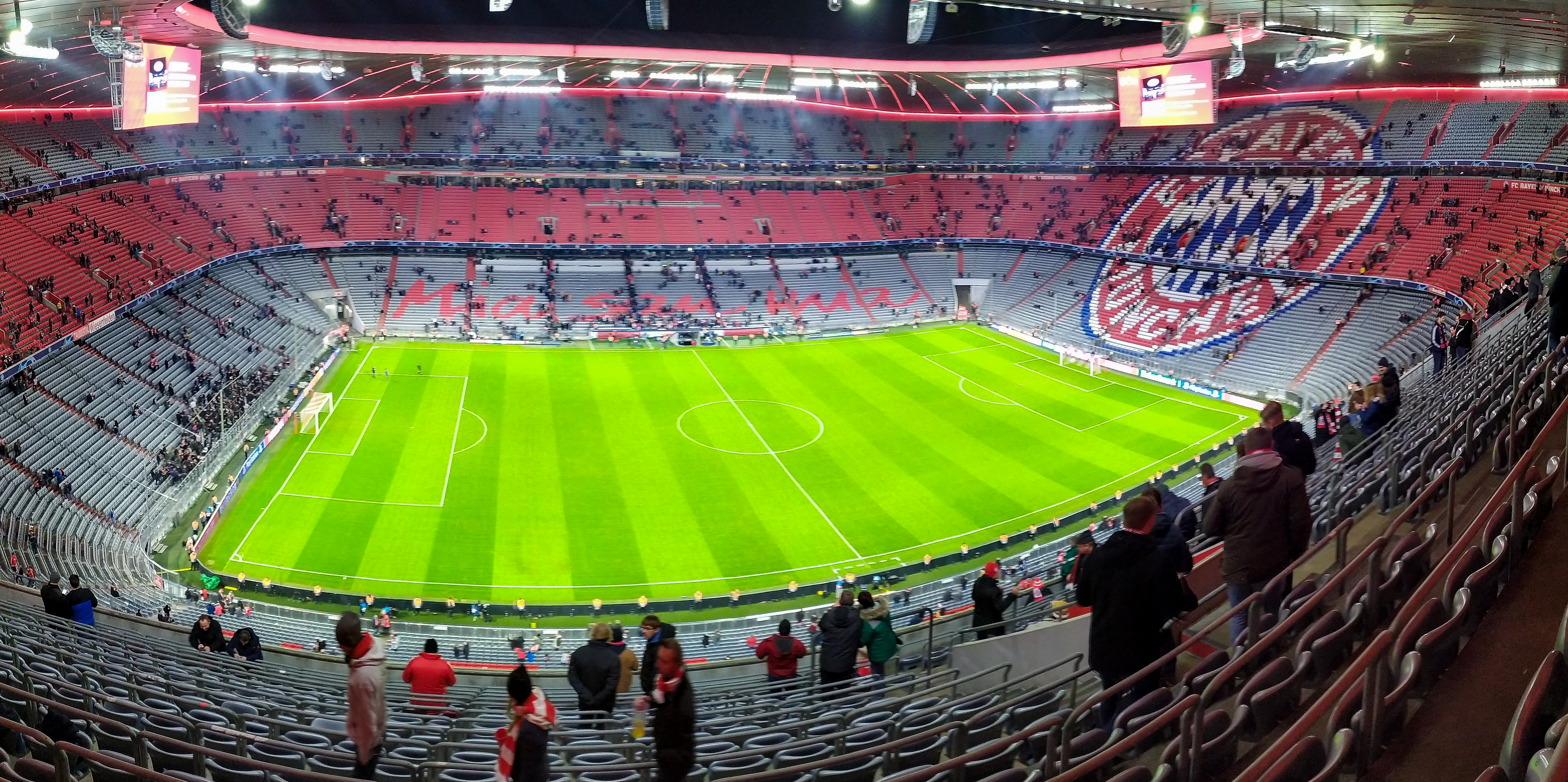
The stadium's interior following the so-called "Bayernization" in 2018

Following the departure of TSV 1860 Munich from the stadium due to its relegation to 3. Liga in 2016–17, Bayern Munich went on to give Allianz Arena a significant facelift a year later, replacing old grey seats with new ones that create a combination of red and white, the colours of the club. The stadium now presents FC Bayern crest on the stand, the "FC Bayern München" writing on one side and the "Mia San Mia" – the club's motto – on the other. Furthermore, several other modifications have also been made, including decorating walls with images of the club's history, bringing a larger quantity of red, and the opening of the FC Bayern store.

On 19 September 2024, it was announced that the stadium's address would be changed to "Franz Beckenbauer Platz 5" in honour of the late German football legend Franz Beckenbauer, who was born in Munich and had played with Bayern Munich from 1964 to 1977. The change took effect on 1 May 2025, before that year's Champions League final which the stadium hosted.

=== Stadium corruption affair ===
Between March 2004 and August 2006, a corruption affair relating to the stadium occupied the football world and German courts. On 9 March 2004, Karl-Heinz Wildmoser Sr., president of TSV 1860 Munich, his son Karl-Heinz Wildmoser Jr., chief executive officer of Allianz Arena München Stadion GmbH, and two others were charged with corruption in connection with the award of arena construction contracts and taken into custody. On 12 March, Wildmoser Sr. struck a plea bargain and was released. As part of the plea bargain, he relinquished the presidency of the club three days later, and on 18 May, the investigation into his conduct was closed.

His son, Karl-Heinz Wildmoser Jr., remained in custody. At a bail hearing on 29 June, the judge refused bail on the grounds of danger of flight and obstruction of justice. The District Attorney filed charges on 23 August 2004, accusing him of fraud, corruption and tax evasion. The case was that Wildmoser Jr. had awarded the construction contract at an inflated price, provided the Austrian builder Alpine with inside information that enabled the builder to win the contract, and in return received €2.8 million.

On 13 May 2005, Karl-Heinz Wildmoser Jr. was convicted and sentenced by a Munich court to four and a half years in prison. He was released on bail pending his appeal. The Federal Court of Justice rejected the appeal in August 2006.

=== Opening day ===
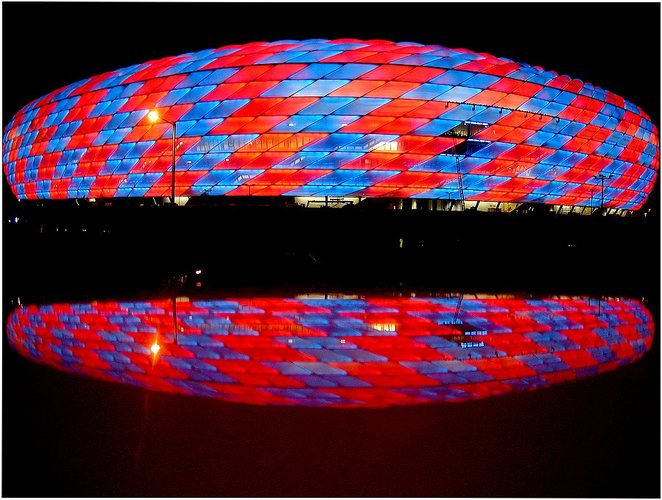
Test illumination in March 2005

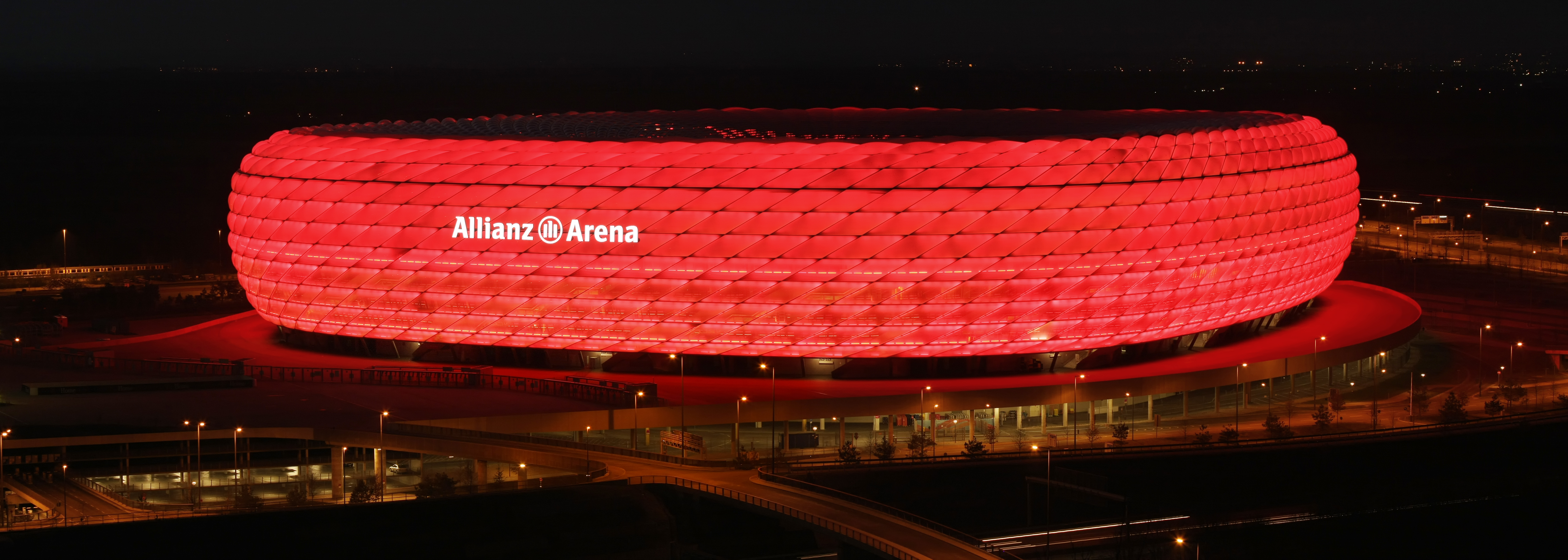
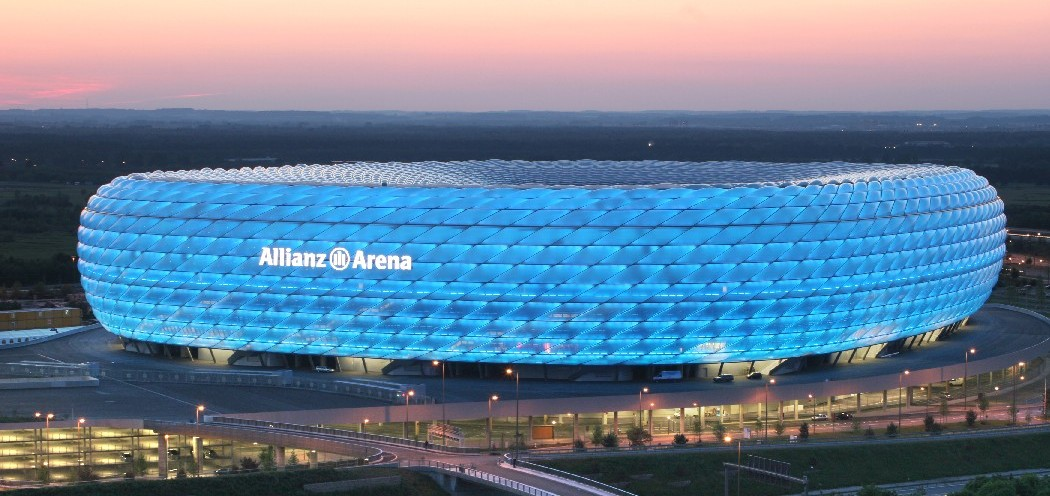
The stadium illuminated in the colours of Bayern Munich (top) and 1860 Munich (bottom)

On 30 May 2005, 1860 Munich played an exhibition game against 1. FC Nürnberg and won, 3–2. The next day, the record German champions Bayern Munich played a game against the Germany national team. Both games had been sold out since early March 2005. Patrick Milchraum of TSV 1860 scored the first official goal at the stadium.

On 2 June 2005, in response to high demand, the first "arena derby" took place between the two tenants. That game was won by TSV 1860 with the help of a goal by Paul Agostino.

Prior to opening day, the alumni teams of both clubs played each other in an exhibition game in front of a crowd of 30,000. During the game, all stadium functions were thoroughly tested.

The stadium's first goal in a competitive game went to Roy Makaay of FC Bayern in the semi-finals of 2005 DFL-Ligapokal on 26 July 2005. In the same game, Thomas Hitzlsperger of VfB Stuttgart scored the first goal in an official game by a visiting team. The game ended with a 2–1 win for Stuttgart.

The first goal in a league game was scored by Owen Hargreaves of FC Bayern when the home team won 3–0 in its 2005–06 Bundesliga season opener against Borussia Mönchengladbach on 5 August 2005. The first goal in a league game by a visiting team was scored by Dynamo Dresden on 9 September 2005 in the 2. Bundesliga match against 1860 Munich. That game ended in a score of 1–2 in front of a full house, which included approximately 20,000 – 22,000 fans who had traveled to Munich from Dresden for the game. Dresden thus became the first visiting team to win a league game at Allianz Arena.

The first goal against FC Bayern Munich in a league game at Allianz Arena was scored by Miroslav Klose of Werder Bremen on 5 November 2005 in the first minute of play. This was to remain the visitors' only goal that day, as the game went to the FC Bayern, with a final score of 3–1.

FC Bayern broke its consecutive sell-out record by selling out each of its first ten home games at Allianz Arena.

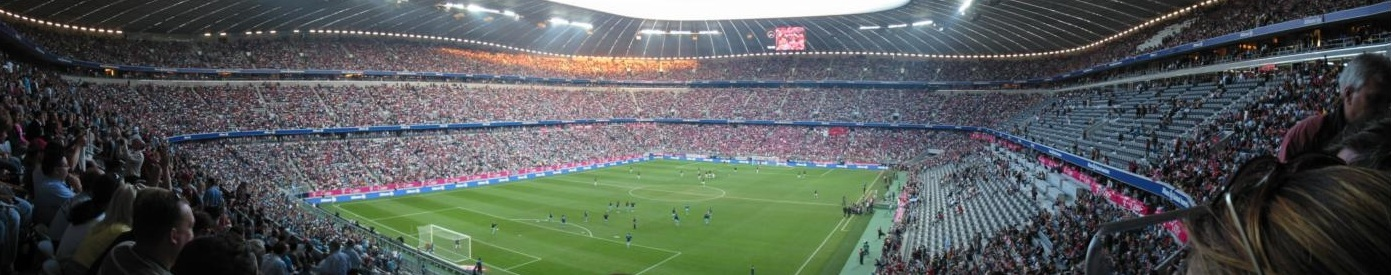
Inside Allianz Arena during a match between Bayern Munich and 1860 Munich, 10 June 2005

== International tournament matches ==
=== UEFA Champions League finals ===
UEFA Champions League finals
Season	Winners	Score	Runners-up	Attendance
2011–12	Chelsea (England)	1–1 (4–3 p)	(Germany) Bayern Munich	62,500
2024–25	Paris Saint-Germain (France)	5–0	(Italy) Inter Milan	64,327

=== 2006 FIFA World Cup ===
The stadium was one of the venues for the 2006 FIFA World Cup. However, due to sponsorship contracts, the arena was called "FIFA World Cup Stadium Munich" during the World Cup.

The following games were played at the stadium during the World Cup of 2006:

Date	Time (CEST)	Team #1	Result	Team #2	Round	Attendance
9 June 2006	18:00	Germany	4–2	Costa Rica	Group A (opening match)	66,000
14 June 2006	18:00	Tunisia	2–2	Saudi Arabia	Group H	66,000
18 June 2006	18:00	Brazil	2–0	Australia	Group F	66,000
21 June 2006	21:00	Ivory Coast	3–2	Serbia and Montenegro	Group C	66,000
24 June 2006	17:00	Germany	2–0	Sweden	Round of 16	66,000
5 July 2006	21:00	Portugal	0–1	France	Semi-finals	66,000

=== UEFA Euro 2020 ===
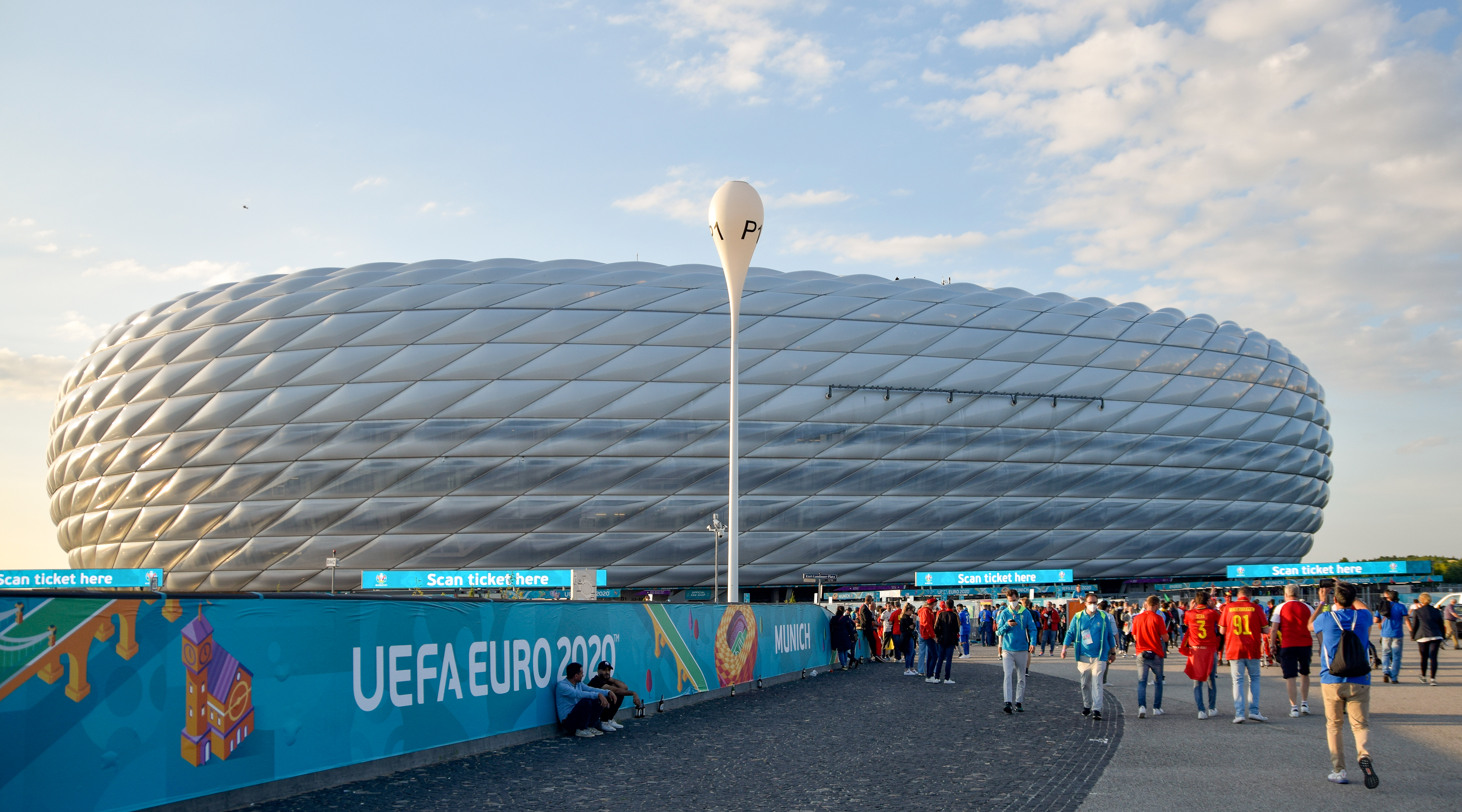
The Allianz Arena before the Belgium-Italy match on 2 July 2021, with the Allianz-lettering being removed temporarily

Date	Time	Team #1	Result	Team #2	Round	Attendance
15 June 2021	21:00	France	1–0	Germany	Group F	12,000
19 June 2021	18:00	Portugal	2–4	Germany	Group F	12,926
23 June 2021	21:00	Germany	2–2	Hungary	Group F	12,413
2 July 2021	21:00	Belgium	1–2	Italy	Quarter-finals	12,984

=== UEFA Euro 2024 ===
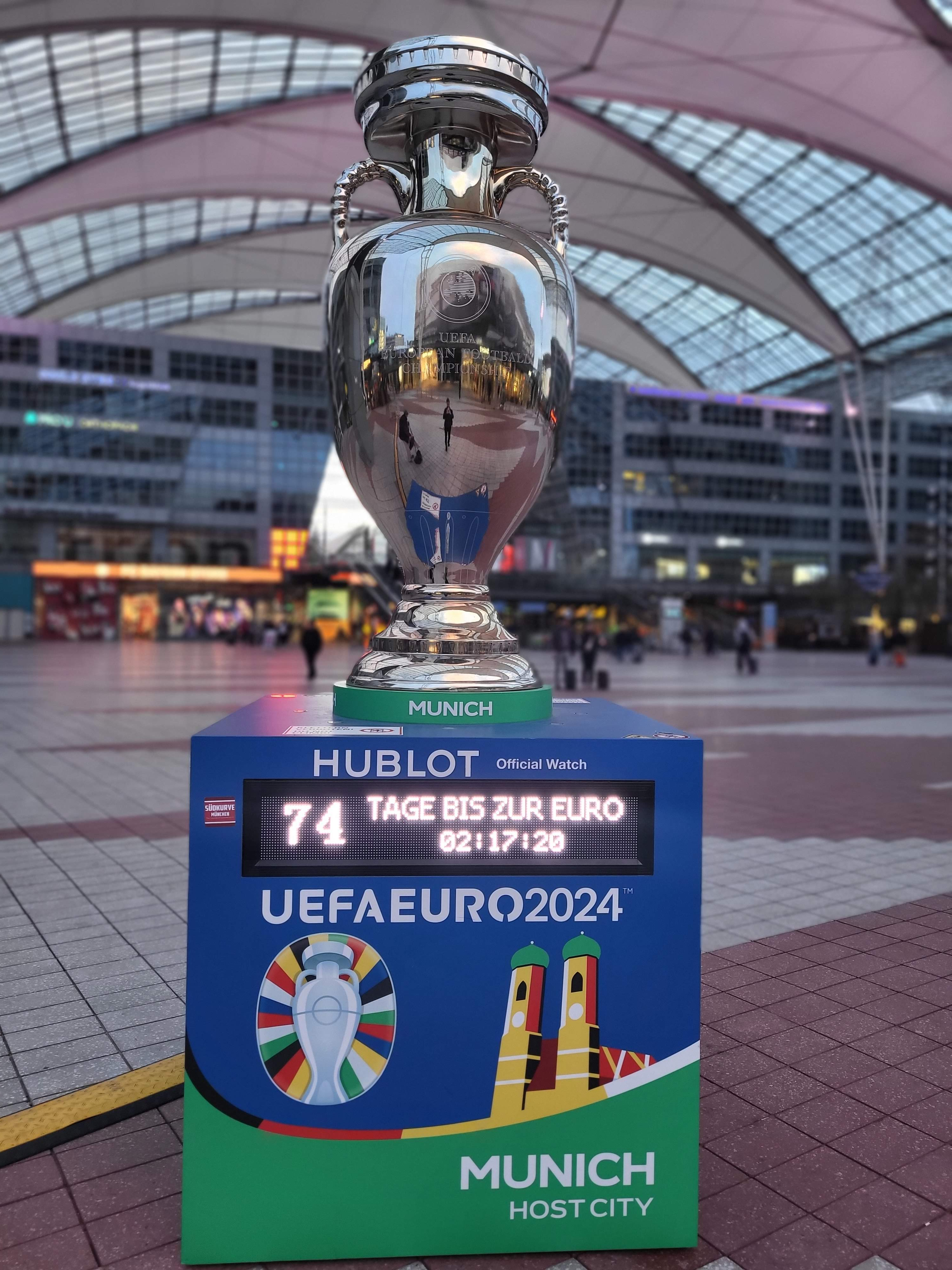
Countdown clock for UEFA Euro 2024 in front of Munich Airport

The stadium hosted four group stage matches (including the opening match), one match in the round of 16 and one semi-final match at the UEFA Euro 2024.

Date	Time	Team #1	Result	Team #2	Round	Attendance
14 June 2024	21:00	Germany	5–1	Scotland	Group A (opening match)	65,052
17 June 2024	15:00	Romania	3–0	Ukraine	Group E	61,591
20 June 2024	15:00	Slovenia	1–1	Serbia	Group C	63,028
25 June 2024	21:00	Denmark	0–0	Serbia	Group C	64,288
2 July 2024	18:00	Romania	0–3	Netherlands	Round of 16	65,012
9 July 2024	21:00	Spain	2–1	France	Semi-finals	62,042

=== 2025 UEFA Nations League Finals ===
Date	Time	Team #1	Result	Team #2	Round	Attendance
4 June 2025	21:10	Germany	1–2	Portugal	Semi-finals	65,823
8 June 2025	21:00	Portugal	2–2 (5–3 p)	Spain	Final	65,852

During the first period of extra time of the final match, a spectator died after falling from an overhead level onto a media area below.

== Other uses ==
=== American football ===
On 9 February 2022, it was announced that the Allianz Arena would host a regular-season game between the Seattle Seahawks and the Tampa Bay Buccaneers as part of the NFL International Series. The Buccaneers, who were the designated home team, defeated the Seahawks 21–16 in front of 69,811 fans in the first regular-season National Football League game played in Germany. Allianz Arena hosted its second NFL International Series regular-season game on 10 November 2024. The Carolina Panthers defeated the New York Giants 20–17 in overtime in front of 70,132 fans. The third international game had the Detroit Lions beat the New England Patriots 35-10 in front of 70,225 spectators.

Year	Date	Designated visitor	Score	Designated home team	Score	Attendance	Event
2022	13 November 2022	Seattle Seahawks	16	Tampa Bay Buccaneers	21	69,811	NFL International Series
2024	10 November 2024	New York Giants	17	Carolina Panthers	20^{OT}	70,132	NFL International Series
2026	15 November 2026	New England Patriots	10	Detroit Lions	35	70,225	NFL International Series
2028	2028						NFL International Series

=== Concerts ===
Date	Performer(s)	Opening act(s)	Tour	Attendance	Revenue
20 June 2025	Guns N' Roses	Rival Sons	Because What You Want & What You Get Are Two Completely Different Things Tour	TBA	TBA
11 June 2026	Linkin Park	Phantogram; Clipse	From Zero World Tour	TBA	TBA
12 June 2026	Linkin Park	Phantogram; Clipse	From Zero World Tour	TBA	TBA
17 June 2026	Foo Fighters	Inhaler; Otoboke Beaver	Take Cover Tour	TBA	TBA
25 June 2026	The Weeknd	Playboi Carti	After Hours til Dawn Tour	TBA	TBA
26 June 2026	The Weeknd	Playboi Carti	After Hours til Dawn Tour	TBA	TBA
27 June 2026	The Weeknd	Playboi Carti	After Hours til Dawn Tour	TBA	TBA
11 July 2026	BTS	-	Arirang World Tour	141,000	$23,700,000
12 July 2026	BTS	-	Arirang World Tour	141,000	$23,700,000
17 July 2026	Helene Fischer	TBA	360° Stadium Tour	TBA	TBA
02 July 2027	Oasis	Richard Ashcroft	Oasis Live '27 Tour	TBA	TBA
03 July 2027	Oasis	Richard Ashcroft	Oasis Live '27 Tour	TBA	TBA
06 July 2027	Oasis	Richard Ashcroft	Oasis Live '27 Tour	TBA	TBA
17 July 2027	Stray Kids	TBA	Run It World Tour	TBA	TBA

== See also ==
- List of stadiums
- NFL International Series

Preceded by World Cup Stadium; Seoul	FIFA World Cup; Opening venue 2006	Succeeded by Soccer City; Johannesburg
Preceded by Wembley Stadium; London	UEFA Champions League; Final venue 2012	Succeeded by Wembley Stadium; London
Preceded by Wembley Stadium; London	UEFA Champions League; Final venue 2025	Succeeded by Puskás Aréna; Budapest
Preceded by De Kuip; De Grolsch Veste	UEFA Nations League; Finals venue 2025 with MHPArena	Succeeded by To be determined
