= Klinikum Großhadern station =

Station of the Munich U-Bahn

Klinikum Großhadern
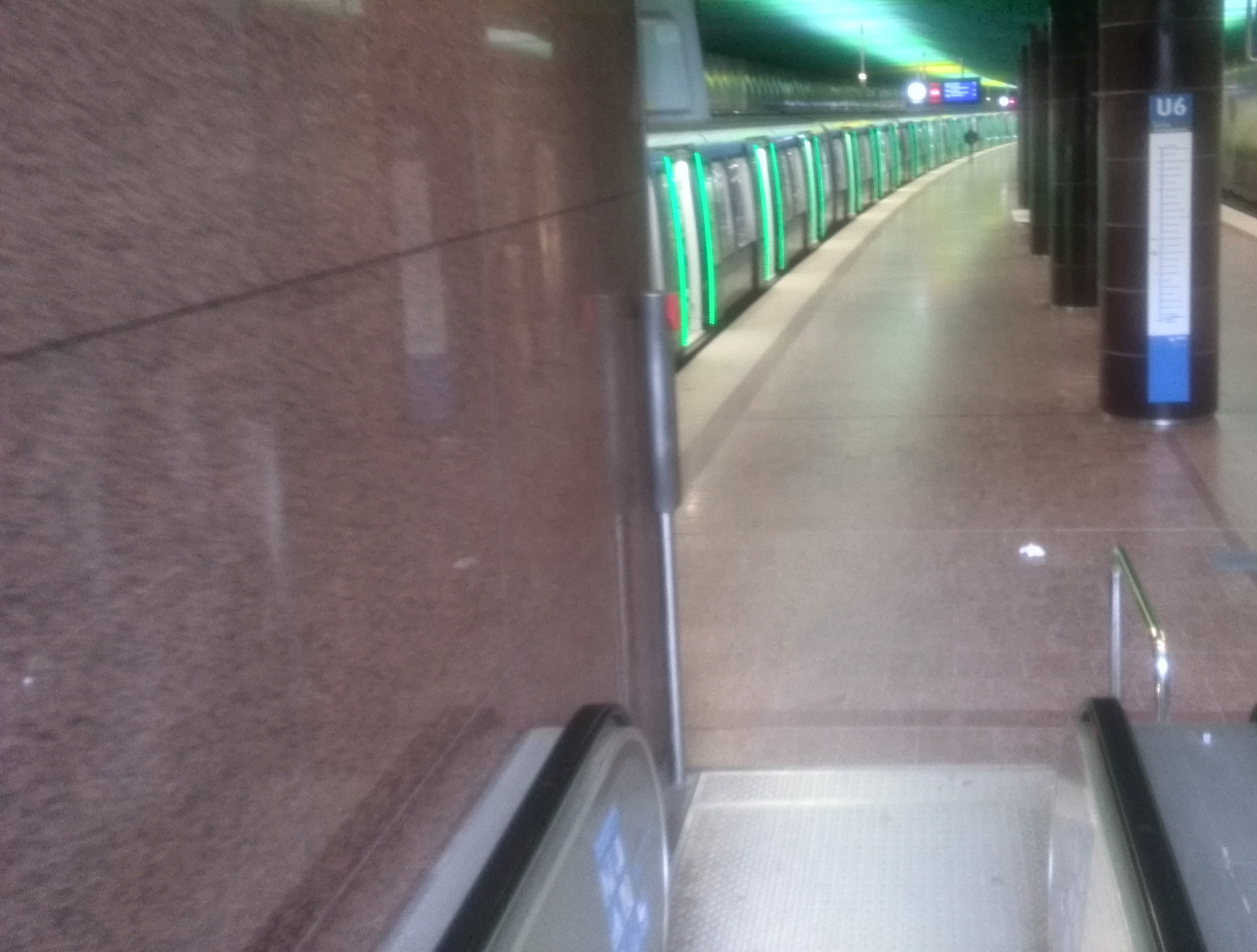

General information
- Location: Max-Lebsche-Platz, Hadern; Munich, Germany
- Coordinates: 48°06′32″N 11°28′25″E
- Connections: MVV buses

Construction
- Structure type: Underground
- Accessible: Yes

Other information
- Fare zone: : M and 1

Services
Preceding station	Munich U-Bahn	Following station
Terminus	U6	Großhadern towards Garching-Forschungszentrum
Location

Klinikum Großhadern is an U-Bahn station in Munich on the U6 line of the Munich Underground system serving the LMU Klinikum – Campus Großhadern hospital (formerly known as Klinikum Großhadern) and nearby student accommodation.

== See also ==
- List of Munich U-Bahn stations
