= Garching-Forschungszentrum station =

Station of the Munich U-Bahn

Garching-Forschungszentrum
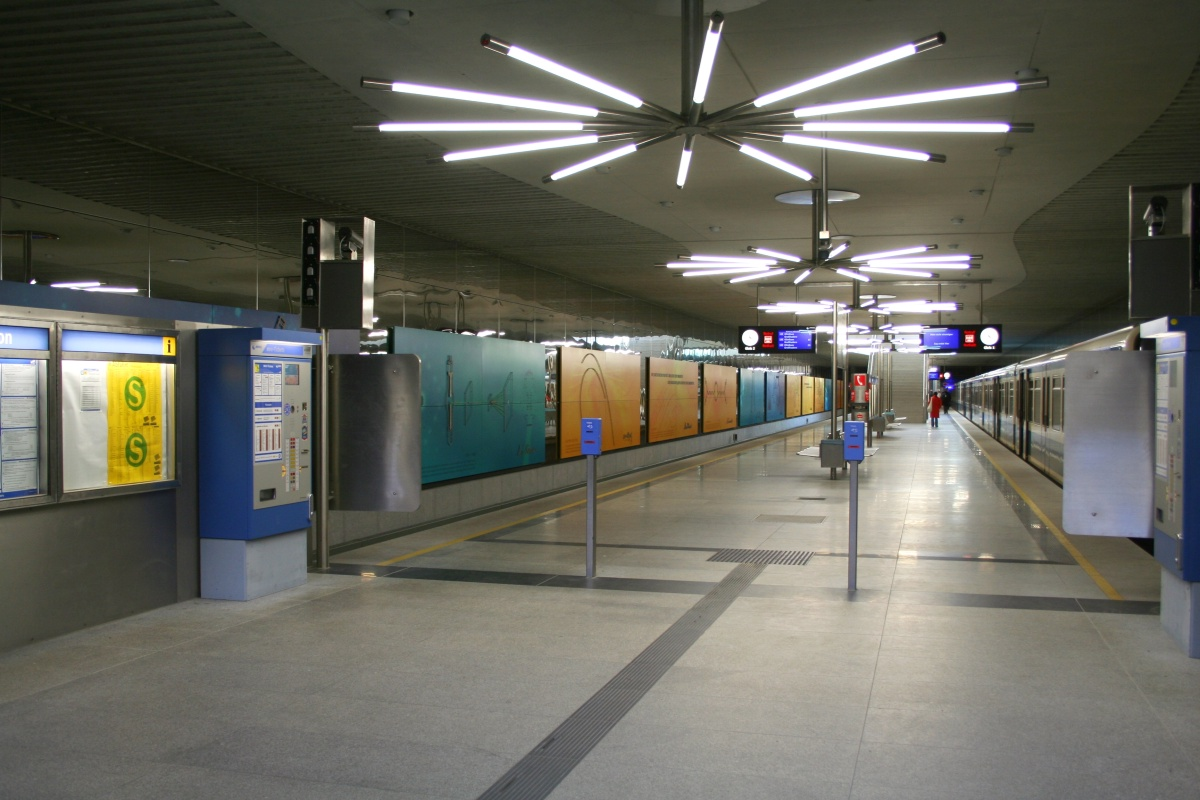

General information
- Location: Garching bei München; Bavaria, Germany
- Coordinates: 48°15′53″N 11°40′17″E
- Platforms: Island platform
- Tracks: 2
- Connections: MVV buses

Construction
- Structure type: Underground
- Accessible: Yes

Other information
- Fare zone: : 2

History
- Opened: 14 October 2006

Services
Preceding station	Munich U-Bahn	Following station
Garching towards Klinikum Großhadern	U6	Terminus
Location

Garching-Forschungszentrum is a Munich U-Bahn station in Garching. It serves as the northern terminus of the U6 line of the Munich U-Bahn system. Opened in 2006, it serves the Campus Garching with its 7,500 employees and around 17,000 students.

== See also ==
- List of Munich U-Bahn stations
