= Theresienwiese =

Official ground of the Munich Oktoberfest

Coordinates: 48°08′N 11°33′E

Theresienwiese is a public space in the Ludwigsvorstadt-Isarvorstadt district of Munich. It covers 42 hectares (100 acres) and is best known as the site of the annual Oktoberfest.

The grounds border the Ruhmeshalle and Bavaria statue in the west and Esperantoplatz in the east, where a memorial commemorates the victims of the 1980 Oktoberfest bombing. The surrounding ring road, Bavariaring, provides access. To the north stands St. Paul's Church.

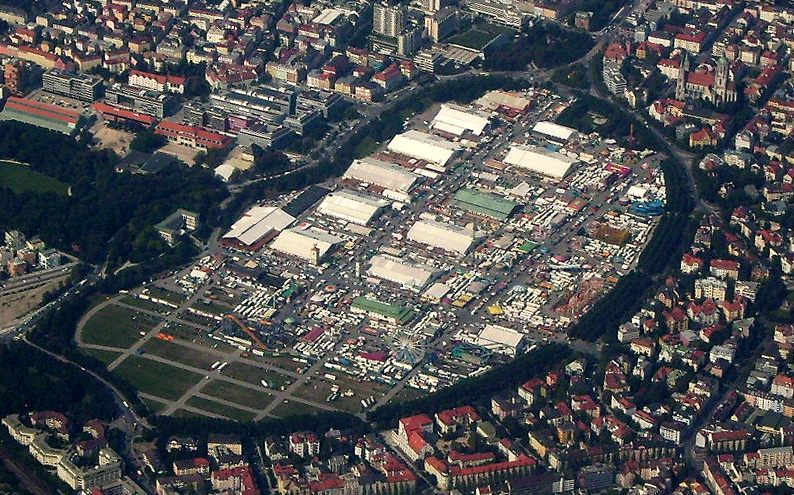
Aerial view of Theresienwiese during Oktoberfest, 2006

== History ==
The site is named after Princess Therese of Saxe-Hildburghausen, wife of King Ludwig I of Bavaria. Their wedding on 12 October 1810, when Ludwig was still crown prince, was held on a meadow outside Munich’s city walls. The meadow, later called Theresienwiese ("Therese's meadow"), became the venue of Oktoberfest, held annually since that year.

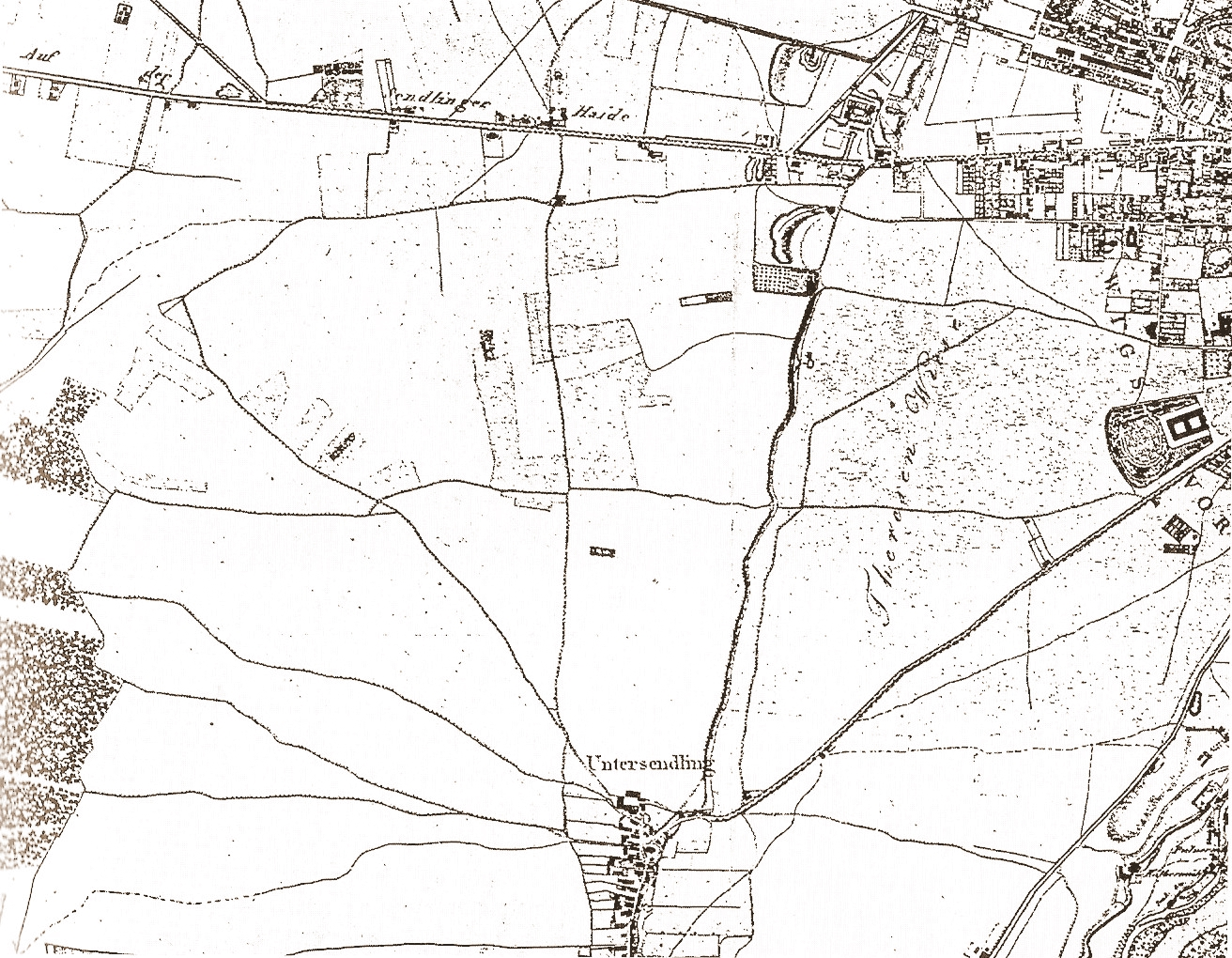
1812 map of Munich and Sendling with Theresienwiese

Since then, the grounds have hosted additional major events, including the spring and winter Tollwood festivals and one of Germany’s largest flea markets each April.

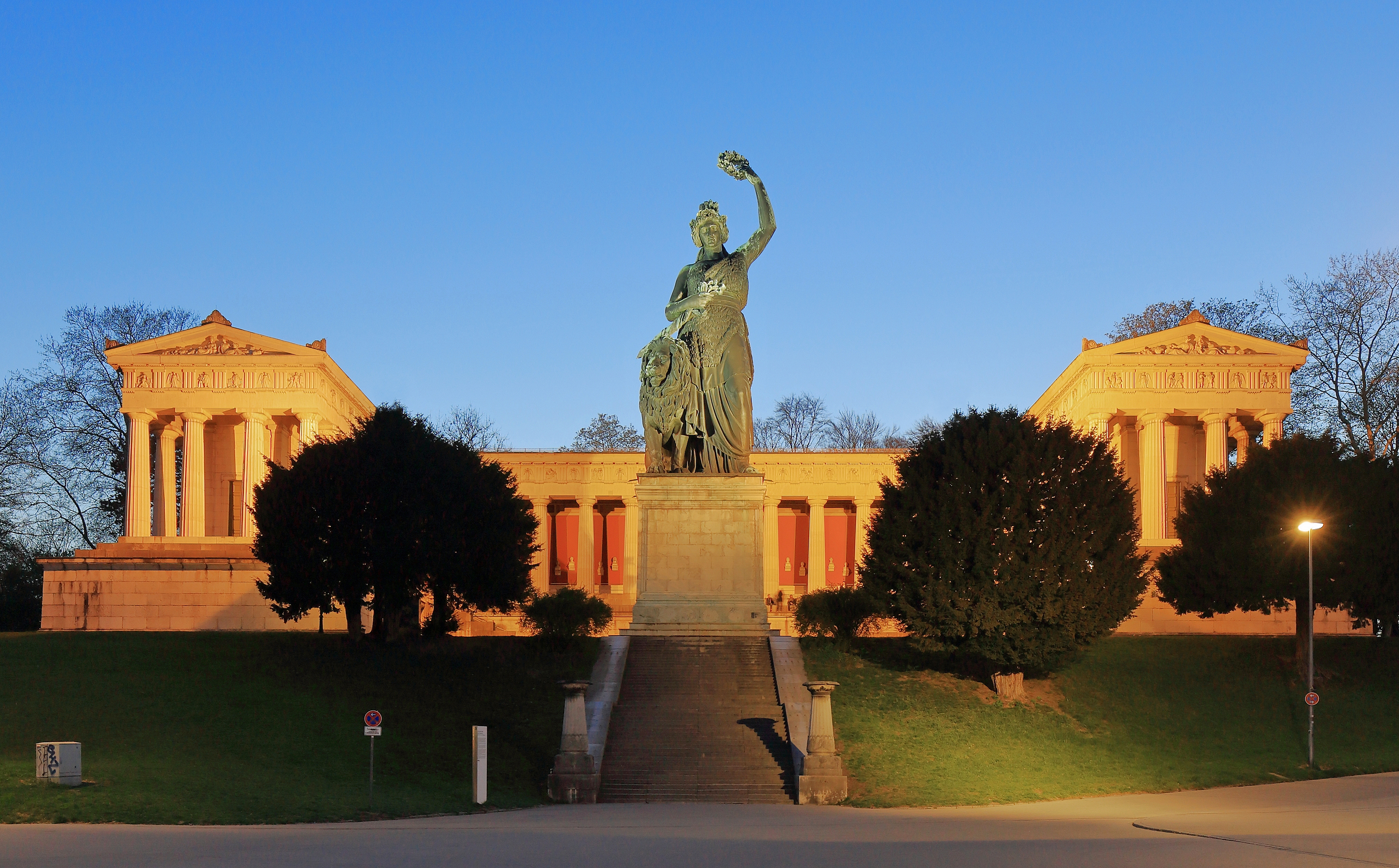
The Bavaria statue and Ruhmeshalle overlooking Theresienwiese

== Location ==
Theresienwiese lies southwest of Munich city centre. It is served by the Theresienwiese station on the Munich U-Bahn lines U4 and U5. The Poccistraße and Goetheplatz stations are near the southern end. The nearest Munich S-Bahn stations are Hackerbrücke and Munich Central Station.
