= Bavarian uprising of 1705–1706 =

Bavarian People's uprising
- Part of War of the Spanish Succession
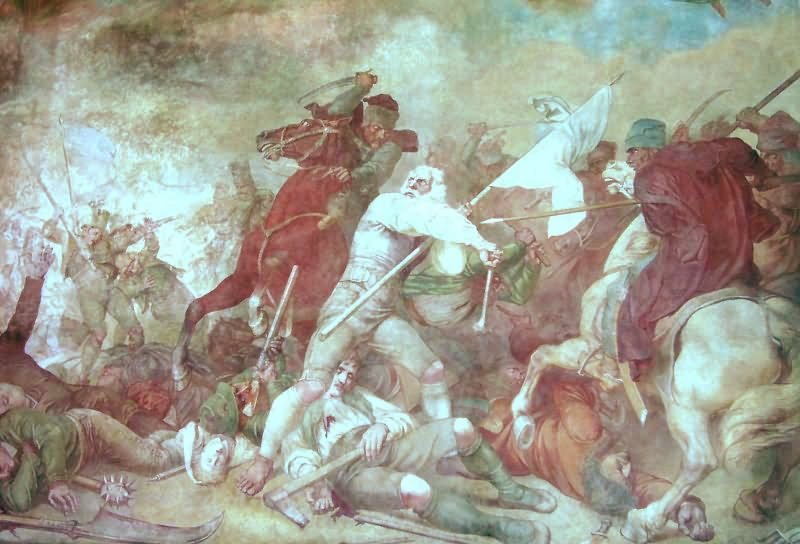
- The 1705 Slaughter of the Sendling Farmers, detail from the fresco by William Lindenschmit the Elder on the Old Parish Church of St. Margaret.
Date	November 1705 – 18 January 1706
Location	Sendling and Aidenbach, Bavaria
Result	Habsburg victory

Belligerents
Bavarian Peasants	Habsburg monarchy

Casualties and losses
c. 5,100	c. 40 + a small unknown number

The Bavarian uprising of 1705–1706 (German: Bayerische Volkserhebung, "Bavarian people's uprising") was a revolt against the occupation of the Electorate of Bavaria by the Imperial Army of the Habsburg Monarchy during the War of the Spanish Succession (1701–1714). It lasted from early November 1705 to 18 January 1706, approximately 75 days. Henric L. Wuermeling speaks of this as "the first revolution of modern history."

== Background ==
By the outbreak of the War of the Spanish Succession in 1701, Maximilian II Emanuel, Elector of Bavaria had developed a plan for the House of Wittelsbach to supplant the House of Habsburg as Holy Roman Emperor. Allying himself with the French against the Habsburgs, his plans were frustrated by the disastrous defeat at the Battle of Blenheim in 1704. Following this defeat, he evacuated his court to the (French occupied) Spanish Netherlands and left Bavaria to the victorious Austrians. While Bavaria was occupied by troops of Emperor Joseph I, the Bavarian people rose up against the Imperial occupation.

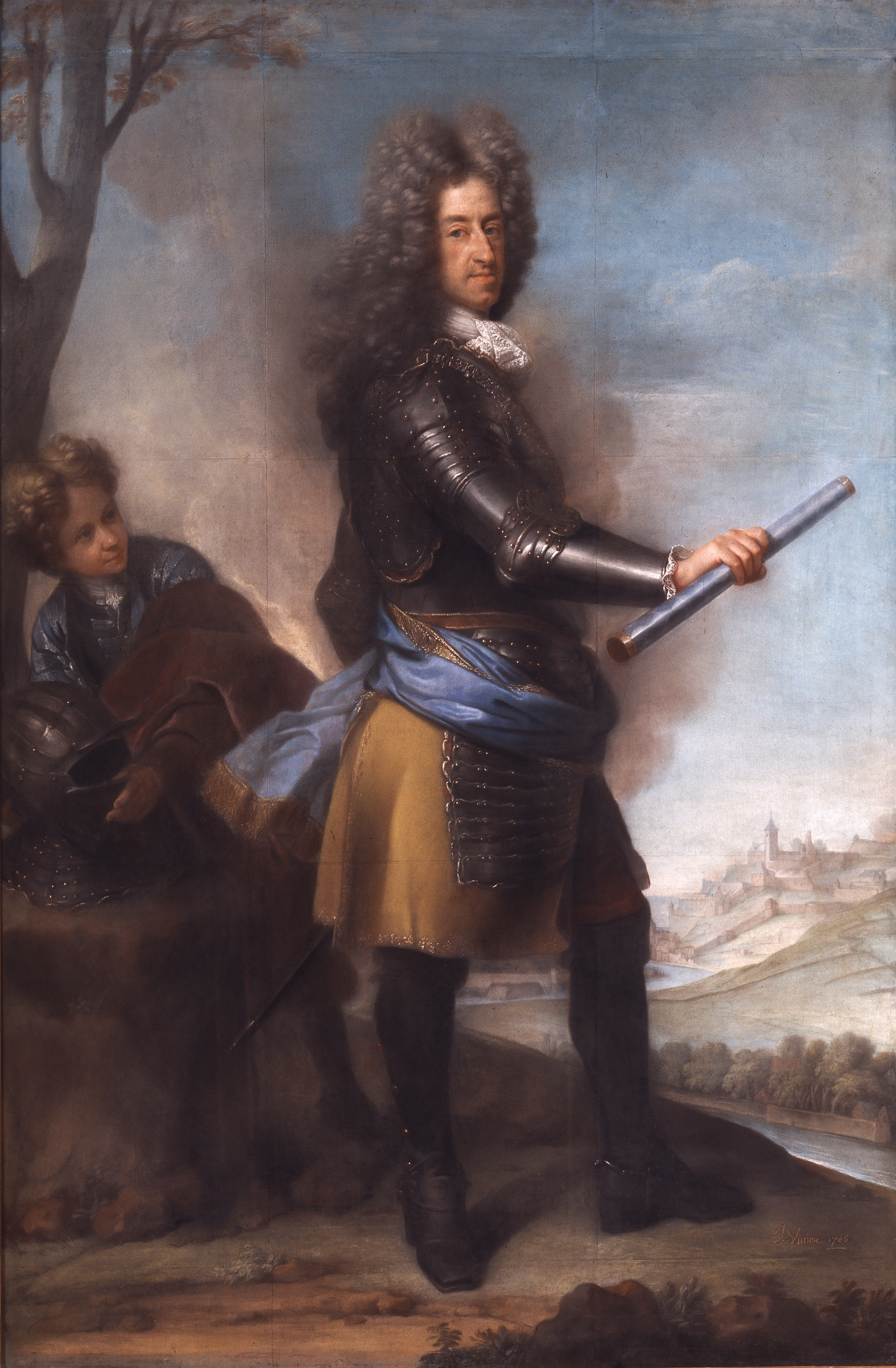
Max Emanuel, Duke of Bavaria

== Events ==
The popular uprising included large areas of Lower Bavaria, the Innviertel and eastern Bavaria. The lands adjoining towns and strongholds were captured by the rebels and the peasant uprising spread to the Bavarian Forest, parts of the Upper Palatinate and Kelheim on the Danube. A meeting was held in December 1705 in Braunau, then still in Bavaria. Long before the French Revolution and early German parliamentarianism, the meeting was held on 21 December 1705 in an inn in an area belonging to the Baron von Paumgarten; representatives of the four estates in Bavaria met: aristocracy, clergy, burghers and peasants. This meeting is known as the Braunau Parliament (Braunauer Parlament). It convened daily, and the representatives of the four estates had equal speaking and voting rights.

Following the initial uprising in November 1705, there was little response from the Austrians for nearly two months. However, that changed following an attempt by the rebels to capture the Bavarian capital, Munich. Following their unsuccessful attack, the night of 25 December 1705 saw an Austrian column encounter the peasant army near Sendling, outside Munich. The battle was known as Sendling's Night of Murder (German: Sendlinger Mordweihnacht) or the Sendling Christmas Day Massacre. The insurgents from the Bavarian Oberland, south of Munich, were completely routed by Emperor Joseph I's troops. The number of deaths on the Bavarian side in this battle is estimated at 1,100 men, but the Austrians lost only about 40. Some of the insurgents were killed after they had already surrendered. About two weeks later, on 8 January 1706, the Battle of Aidenbach ended with the utter defeat of the insurgents and about 4,000 casualties on the Bavarian side. That led to the collapse of the uprising against Austria.

== End of the uprising ==
On 11 January 1706, a delegation from the insurrection traveled to Salzburg for peace negotiations. The delegation included Mayor Dürnhardt, Freiherr von Paumgarten, Freiherr Franz Bernhard von Prielmayr, Mayor Georg Ludwig Harter of Burghausen and the farmer Franz Nagelstätter. On 13 January 1706 the city of Schärding surrendered, followed on the 16th by Cham, on the 17th by Braunau; and on the 18th, the last city, Burghausen surrendered.

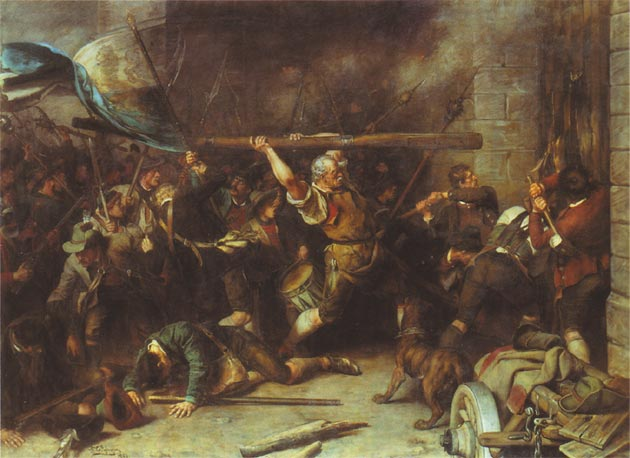
Bavarian national uprising -Defregger Schmied

== Leaders of the uprising ==
A "list of the ringleaders of the peasant uprising" included 15 names or descriptions:

1. "The Butcher of Höchenwarth, called Khurtz" (today the village of Hohenwart near Emmerting, Altötting district)
2. "The innkeeper's son from Engelsperg, thenthe small market town of Düssling" (today Engelsberg, Traunstein, and Tüßling, Altötting district)
3. "Würth from Schilting" (presumably Schildthurn, part of the community of Zeilarn, Rottal-Inn district)
4. "Würth from Hürsching" (presumably: Hirschhorn, now part of Wurmannsquick, Rottal-Inn district)
5. "Würth from Imb", Ibm village Eggelsberg, district of Braunau am Inn in Austria
6. "The so-called old Hofpaur of Wuehrlach, resident half an hour from Braunau"
7. "The Naglstetter (nailer?) of Kriesbach, Braunau district" (today Kriebach in Hochburg-Ach, district of Braunau)
8. "(equally) the [rottpaartete Schwaiger], also from Hochburg-Ach
9. Schiennkhhueber at Mitterndorf, also Hochburg-Ach
10. "Neuhauser, Hofburg, also Hochburg-Ach
11. "The so-called Maindlsperger of the Eggelsperg district (Eggelsberg, district of Braunau)
12. "The Plündtgannser gewester Congress Secretary in Braunau", Georg Sebastian Plinganser of Postmünster, Rottal-Inn district
13. "The chief rebel Meindl together with the Würth Schweigsroidt": Johann Georg Meindl from Weng im Innkreis, district of Braunau
14. "The former Comissari Fux": Giles Matthias Fuchs
15. "Hoffmann": Johann Hoffmann, born in Pleystein, Upper Palatinate, but at the beginning of the Bavarian uprising, settled in Tann, Rottal-Inn district.

A figure said to having taken part on the side of the Oberland insurgents was a certain Balhtasar Mayr or Balthasar Riesenberger, Smith of Kochel, a popular, legendary folk hero in southern Bavaria ever since. However, his existence - not to speak of any participation - could never be proved. He, so it seems, may have been invented to soothe the pain over the losses and the defeat.

== See also ==
- List of revolutions and rebellions
- List of rebellions in the Habsburg monarchy
