= Fraunhoferstraße =

Station of the Munich U-Bahn

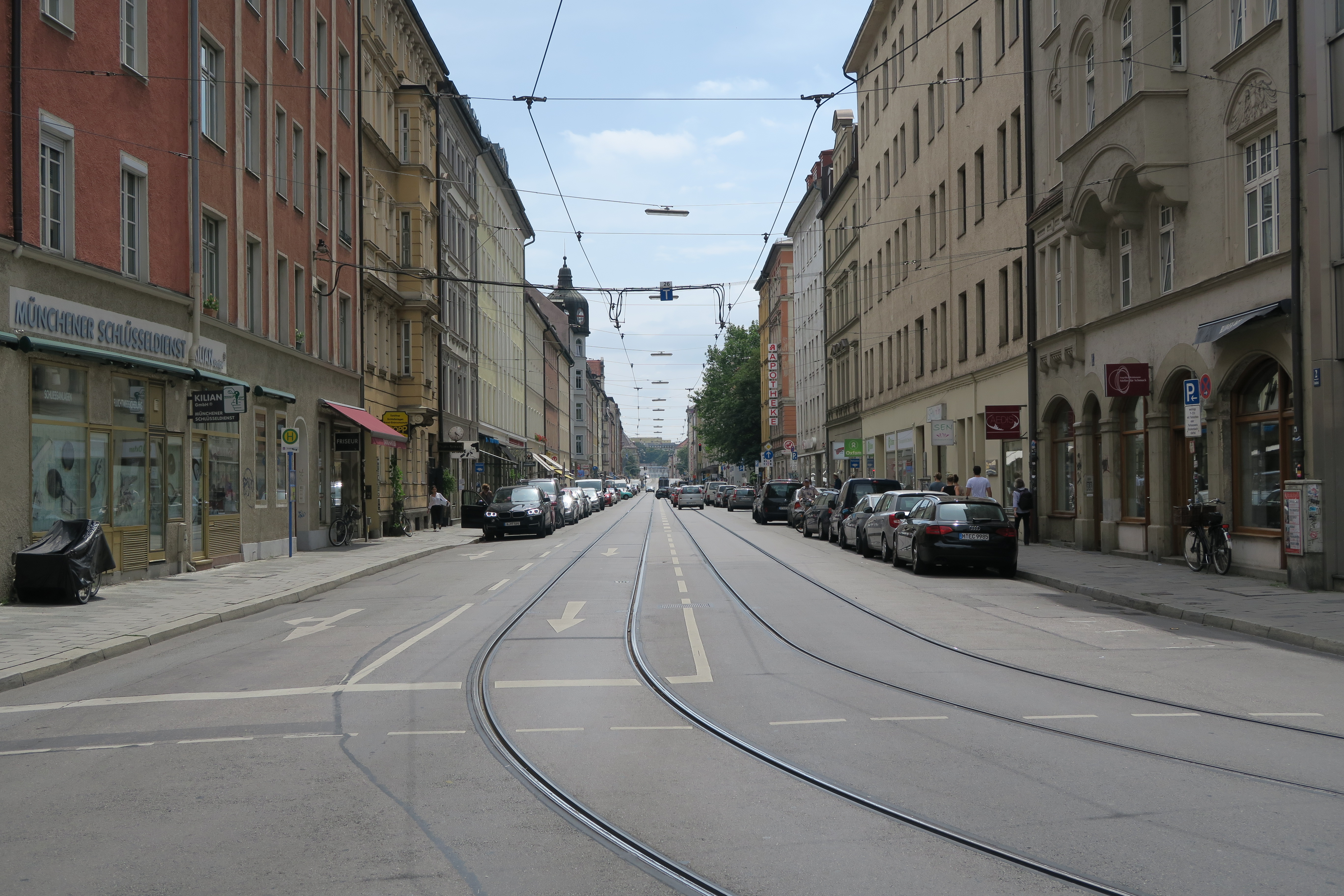
Fraunhoferstraße with direction to the Isar

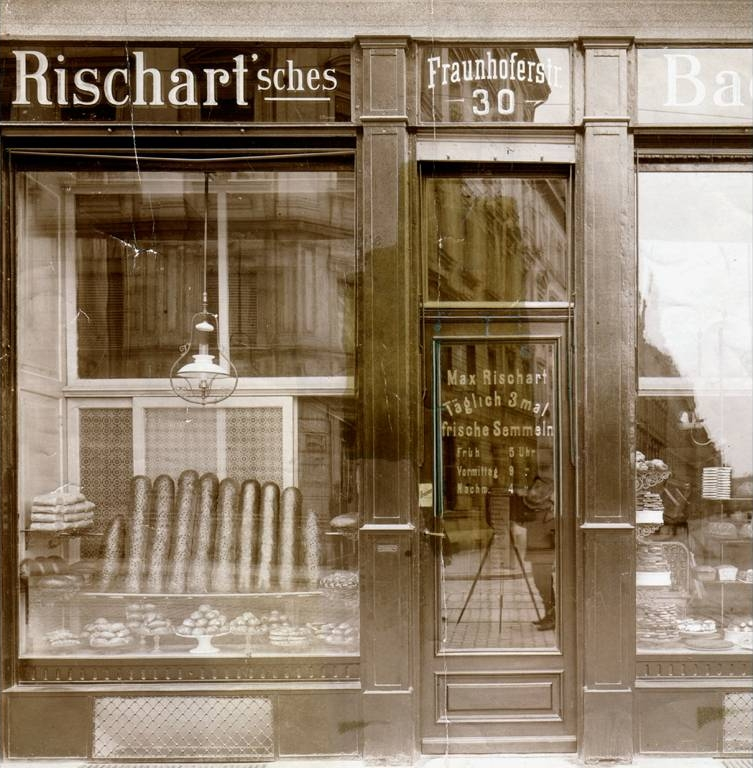
Shop on Fraunhoferstraße from around 1900 (Rischart bakery)

The Fraunhoferstraße is a city center street in Munich. It is located in the district of Isarvorstadt and separates the Gärtnerplatzviertel in the north from the Glockenbachviertel in the south.

It starts at Müllerstraße and ends at the Reichenbachbrücke and is about 520 meters long. It was named after the German optician and second honorary citizen of the city, Joseph von Fraunhofer.

== Transportation importance ==
The Fraunhoferstraße is a traffic axis of inner-city importance, which connects the Altstadtring radially with the, beyond the Isar, district of Au and continues on towards Nockherberg until Giesing. Due to the roll the street plays in this connection function, it is heavily used by delivery traffic.

The tram runs across the full length of Fraunhoferstraße. Under the road, the main line 2 of the Munich U-Bahn with the subway station Fraunhoferstraße near the Reichenbach bridge runs. There, trains of the lines U1, U2 and U7 operate.

== Beginnings ==
The Fraunhoferstraße that runs from Müllerstraße to Reichenbachbrücke, alongside Tal and Zweibrückenstraße is the oldest transport connection of the inner-city districts with the river Isar to the right expanding parts of Munichs districts, carries its name since 1830. Formerly called Stadtbleichanger (Bleachfield), it was renamed in memory of the most important optician of his time, Joseph von Fraunhofer. The area along the present Fraunhoferstraße was known as Stadtbleichanger, because at one time the city bleach settled there. Those who went there, in the year of the naming of Müllerstraße, came through the lane towards Isar and had only undeveloped, open land in front of them. The Müllerstraße, which was planted with poplars along its entire length, bordered on the town fortifications, which at that time still had been largely preserved, with the gate and two bastions in front of it as a bricked partition. Along Fraunhoferstraße itself, located at the height of the former Colosseum, is to this day the areal view of the Colosseum, the military mill, located on Mahlmühlbach, which has been known as the Mühle in der Sälbenau since the 14th century. North on Müllerstraße, one could see the military hospital built around 1776. It later made way for the Luitpoldgymnasium. The path over to the Isar led through fields and meadows past two idyllic country estates, one of which, together with the beautiful, overgrown with old trees garden only which fall victim to the construction of the post office building in 1929. Not far away from it was also a leather factory. South of this factory, next to the Isar, was the lower Pulvermühle (powder mill) and the romantically situated Wollgarten (wool garden) joined the old Brachhaus (plague house). Two streams, one of them known as Blererbach, which were accessible through wooden walkways, flowed through the grounds. The construction of the first Reichenbach Bridge in 1842 only slowly increased construction activity on Fraunhoferstraße. A panoramic photograph, taken in 1858 by Peter Böttger from the Petersturm, shows little new development on the Fraunhoferstraße. Only 15 years later, the north side of Fraunhoferstraße was already fully developed, while the south side, where once the royal hay magazine had its place, still showed open meadows and gardens. In the following decades, however, brisk construction activity was also underway here, and here residential buildings and, among other things, the old Klenzeschule were built.

== Listed buildings on Fraunhoferstraße ==
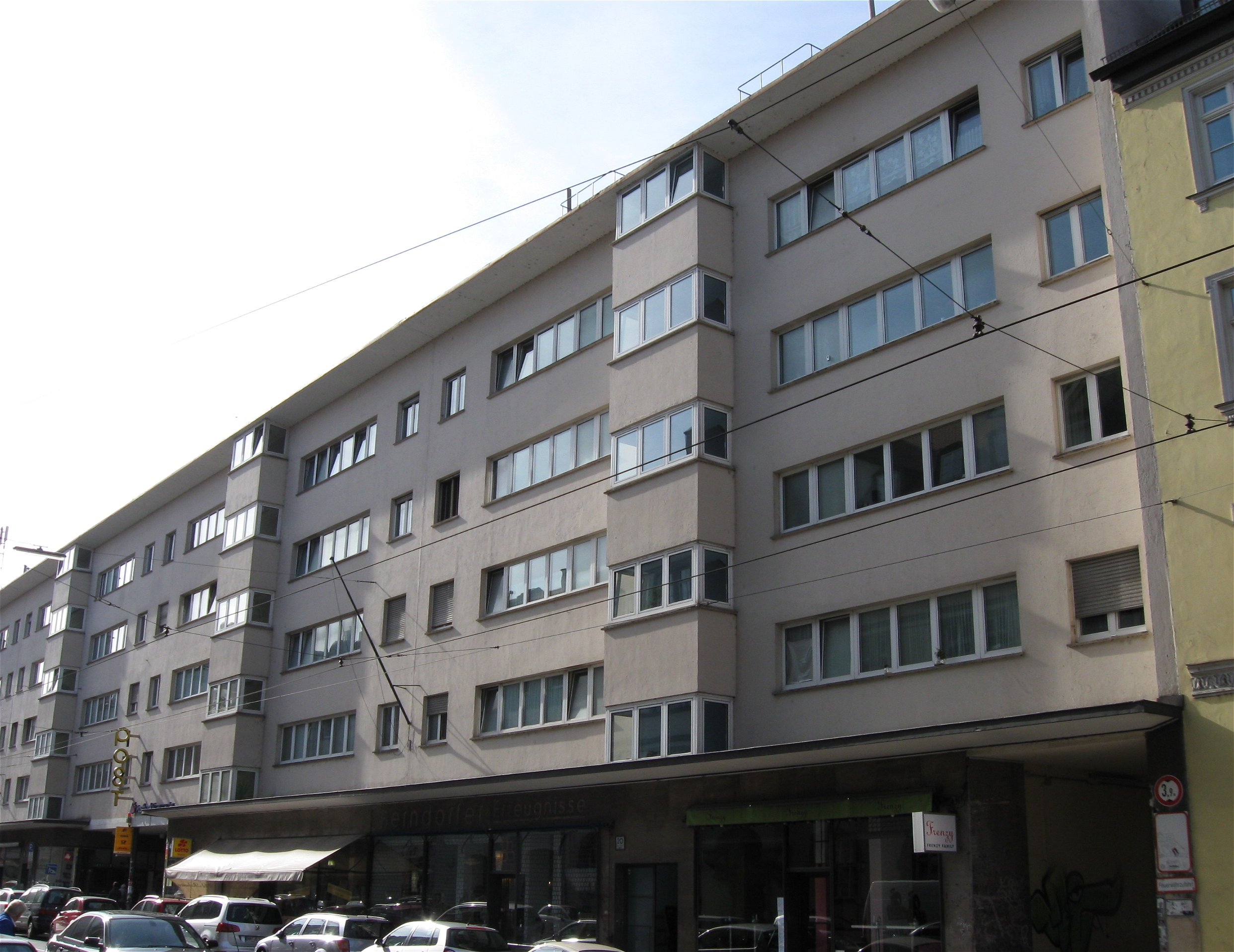
Post office building on Fraunhoferstraße

Twenty-two buildings on Fraunhoferstraße are listed as individual architectural monuments. On the north side, every building from number 3 through 21 is listed without exception. Number 9 houses the Gaststätte Fraunhofer with the Theater im Fraunhofer and the Werkstattkino.

Architecturally noteworthy is the post office block (Fraunhoferstraße 20/22/24/26), the former Munich Post Office No. 5, built in 1929 by Robert Vorhoelzer and Walther Schmidt.

See also: List of listed buildings in Isarvorstadt

== See also ==
- Fraunhoferstraße (Munich U-Bahn)
