= Bavarian Oberland =

The Bavarian Oberland (German: Bayerisches Oberland, pronounced [ˈbaɪʁɪʃəs ˈoːbɐlant]) is a region in Upper Bavaria north of and including the Bavarian Pre-alps between the rivers Lech and Inn.

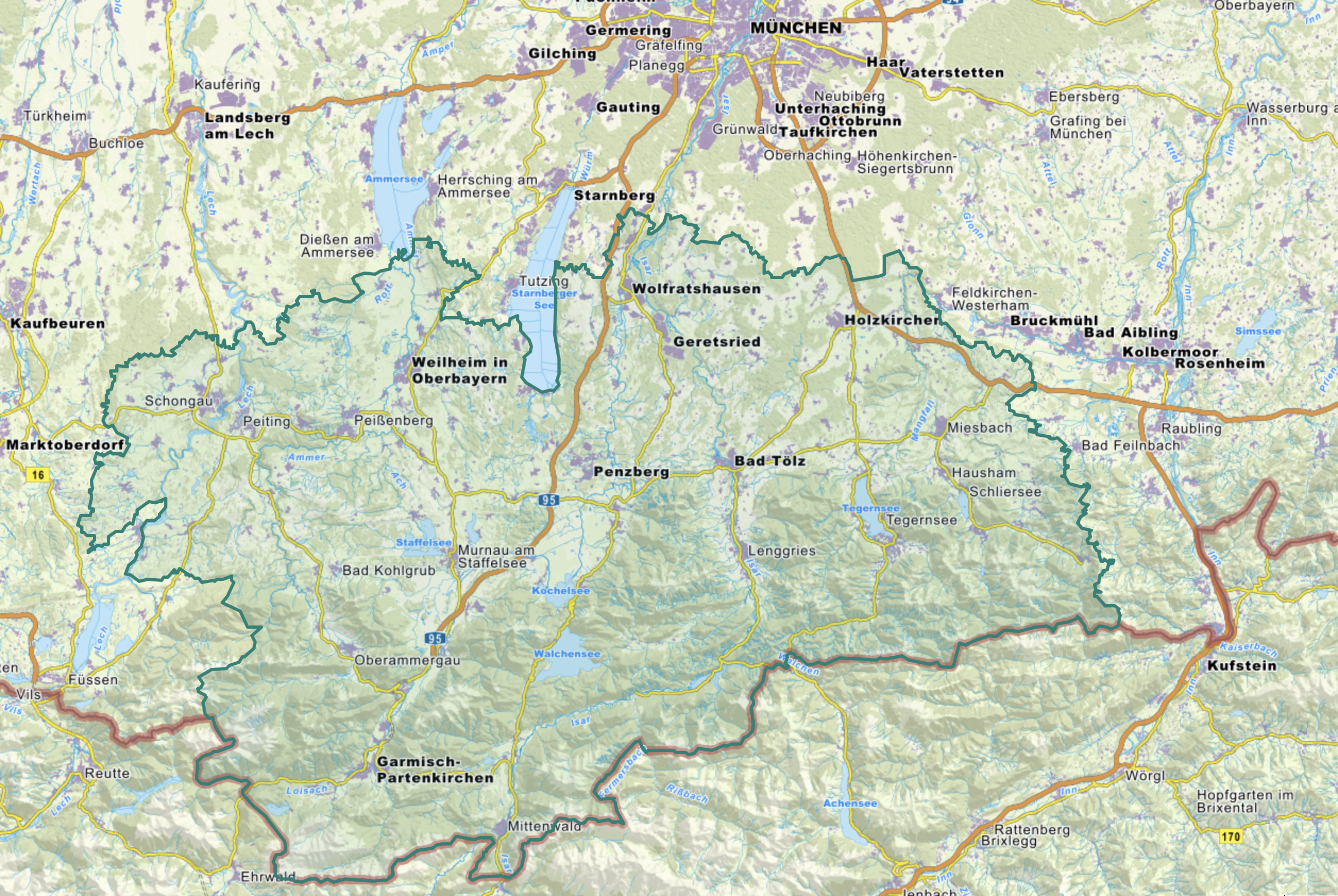
Map of the Bavarian Oberland

== Historical Oberland ==
Originally the region, which roughly corresponds to the county of Miesbach, was called the Oberland.

In 1705, during the War of the Spanish Succession the first rebellion against its Austrian occupiers broke out. This Bavarian People's Uprising soon met a tragic end in the Sendling night of murder.

== Oberland Planning Region ==
Since the creation in the 1970s of the Oberland Planning Region, the term has changed.

The planning region extends over the four counties of Miesbach, Bad Tölz-Wolfratshausen, Garmisch-Partenkirchen and Weilheim-Schongau. Sometimes areas to the north (Munich, Starnberg, Landsberg am Lech) or to the east (Chiemgau) are incorrectly considered part of the Bavarian Oberland.

The Bavarian Oberland is a region that is still largely rural and that continues to play a major role in its culture and customs. The region is one of the strongest economically in Germany today. Tourism is of great significance as well as agriculture and forestry. Today (2006) around 432,000 people live in the region on an area of 3,953 km^{2}. In a 2006 Germany-wide survey into how content people were with where they lived the Bavarian Oberland achieved first place.
