= Theresienwiese station =

Station of the Munich U-Bahn

Theresienwiese
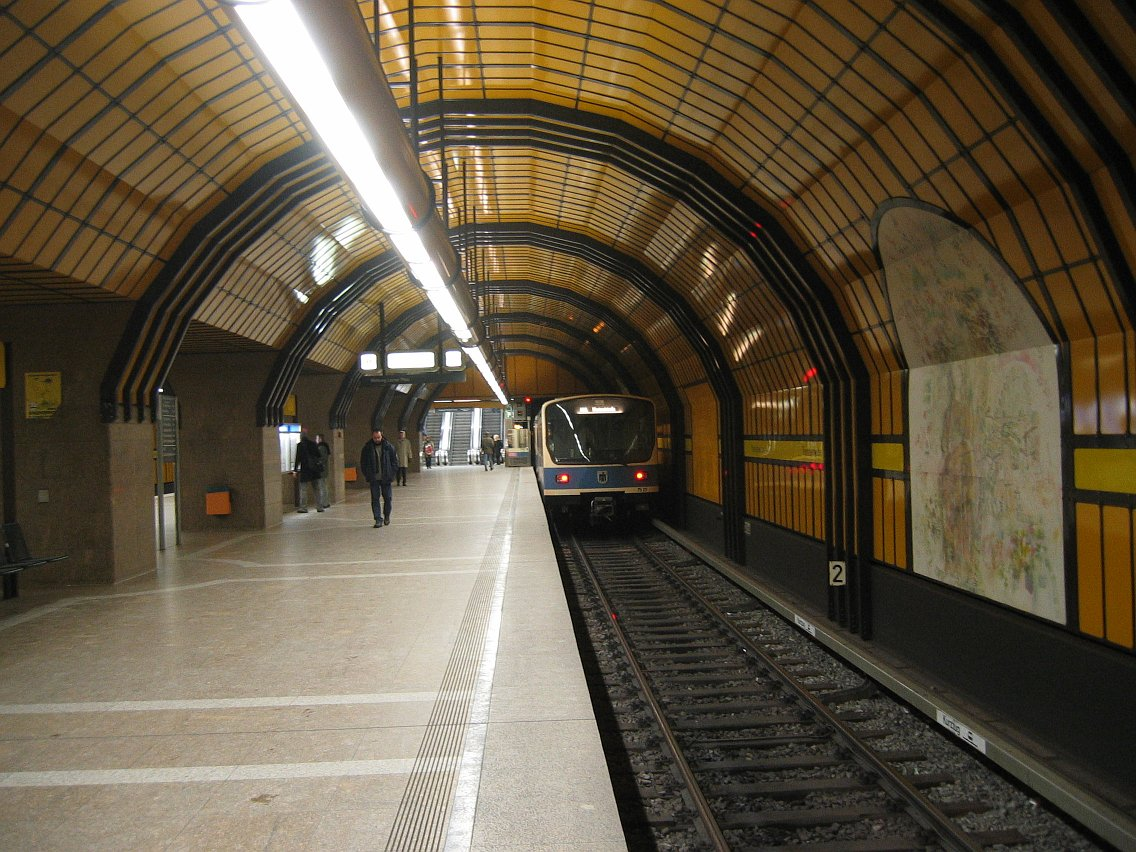
- Platform level

General information
- Location: Ludwigsvorstadt-Isarvorstadt, Munich; Germany
- Coordinates: 48°08′11″N 11°33′12″E
- Platforms: Island platform
- Tracks: 2

Construction
- Structure type: Underground
- Accessible: yes

Other information
- Fare zone: : M

Services
Preceding station	Munich U-Bahn	Following station
Schwanthalerhöhe towards Westendstraße	U4	Hauptbahnhof towards Arabellapark
Schwanthalerhöhe towards Laimer Platz	U5	Hauptbahnhof towards Neuperlach Süd
Location

Theresienwiese is an underground station on the Munich U-Bahn network, served by the U4 and U5 lines. It is the nearest station to the Oktoberfest grounds on the Theresienwiese.

During Oktoberfest, the station accommodates about 21,000 passengers per hour in each direction.

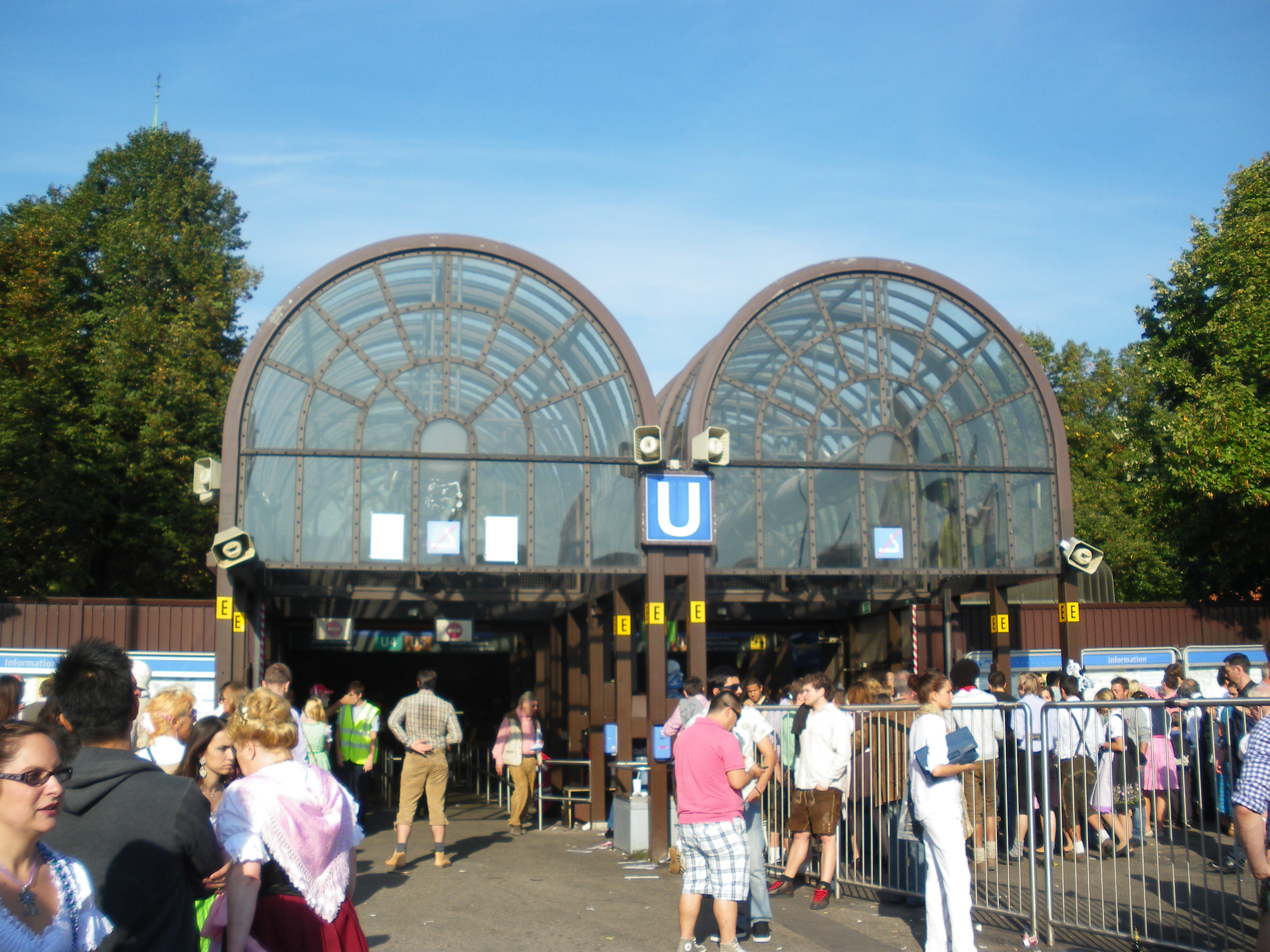
South entrance of the station at the north edge of Theresienwiese

== See also ==
- List of Munich U-Bahn stations
