= Ludwigsvorstadt-Isarvorstadt =

Borough of Munich, Germany

Coordinates: 48°07′38″N 11°33′53″E

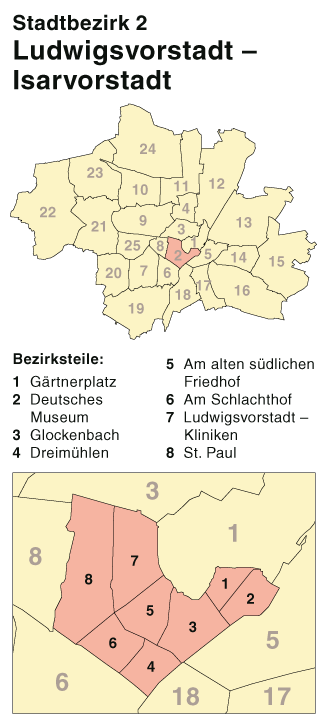
Ludwigsvorstadt-Isarvorstadt, location within Munich

Ludwigsvorstadt-Isarvorstadt (German pronunciation: [ˈluːtvɪçsˌfoːɐ̯ʃtat ˈʔiːzaʁˌfoːɐ̯ʃtat]; Central Bavarian: Ludwigsvorstod-Isarvorstod) is one of the boroughs of Munich, Germany.

It consists of the districts Ludwigsvorstadt, located south of Munich Hauptbahnhof and east of the Theresienwiese, and Isarvorstadt, which is north-west of the River Isar and southeast of Munich's Old Town. The Lindwurmstraße serves as a divider for the two districts.

The population is estimated to be 54,049, according to the 2015 census.

Benoit Blaser (The Greens) is the borough mayor since 2020, preceded by Andreas Klose (2019-2020) and Alexander Miklosy (2002-2018) (both Pink List).

== The borough ==
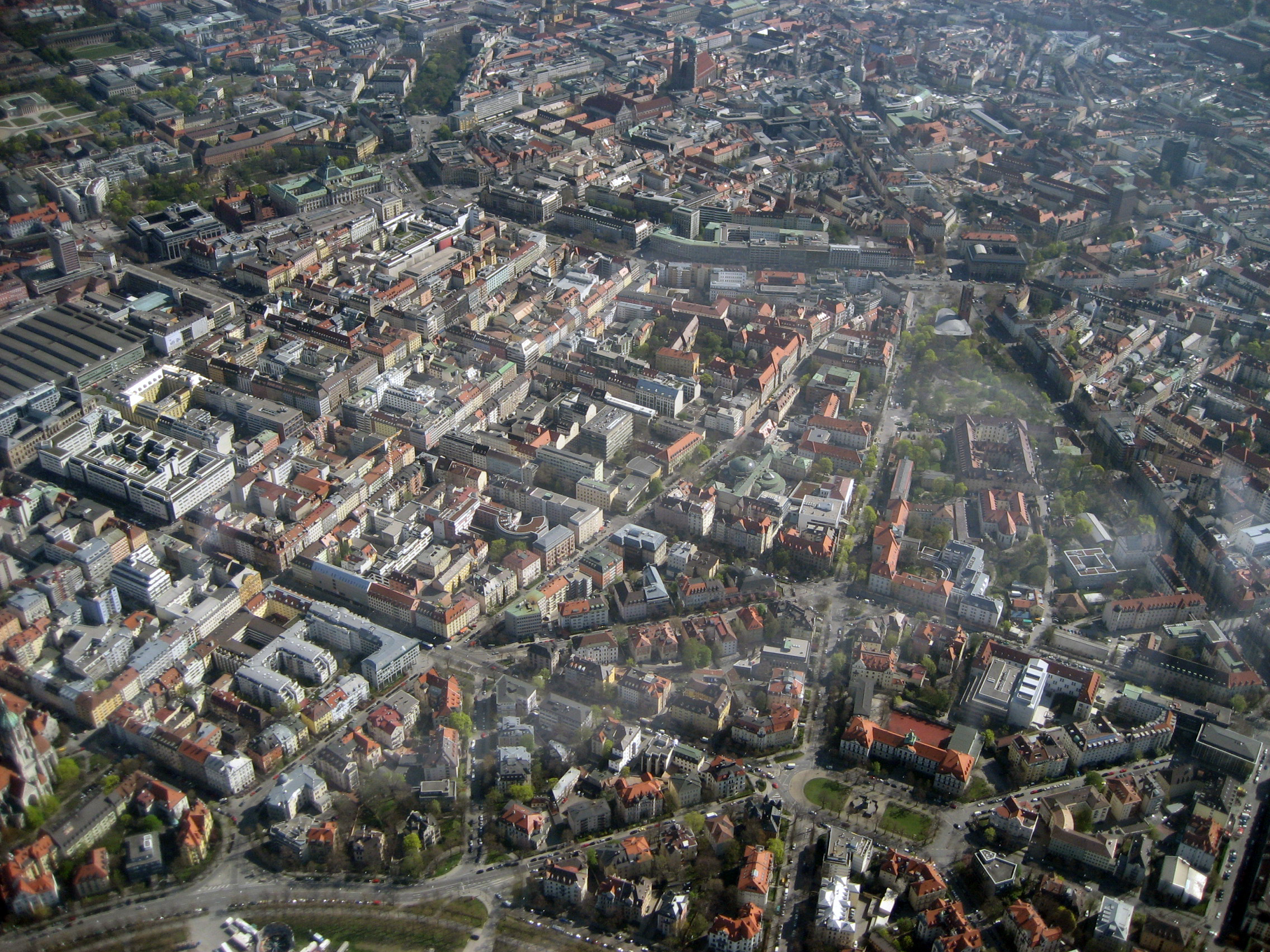
Aerial view of Ludwigsvorstadt

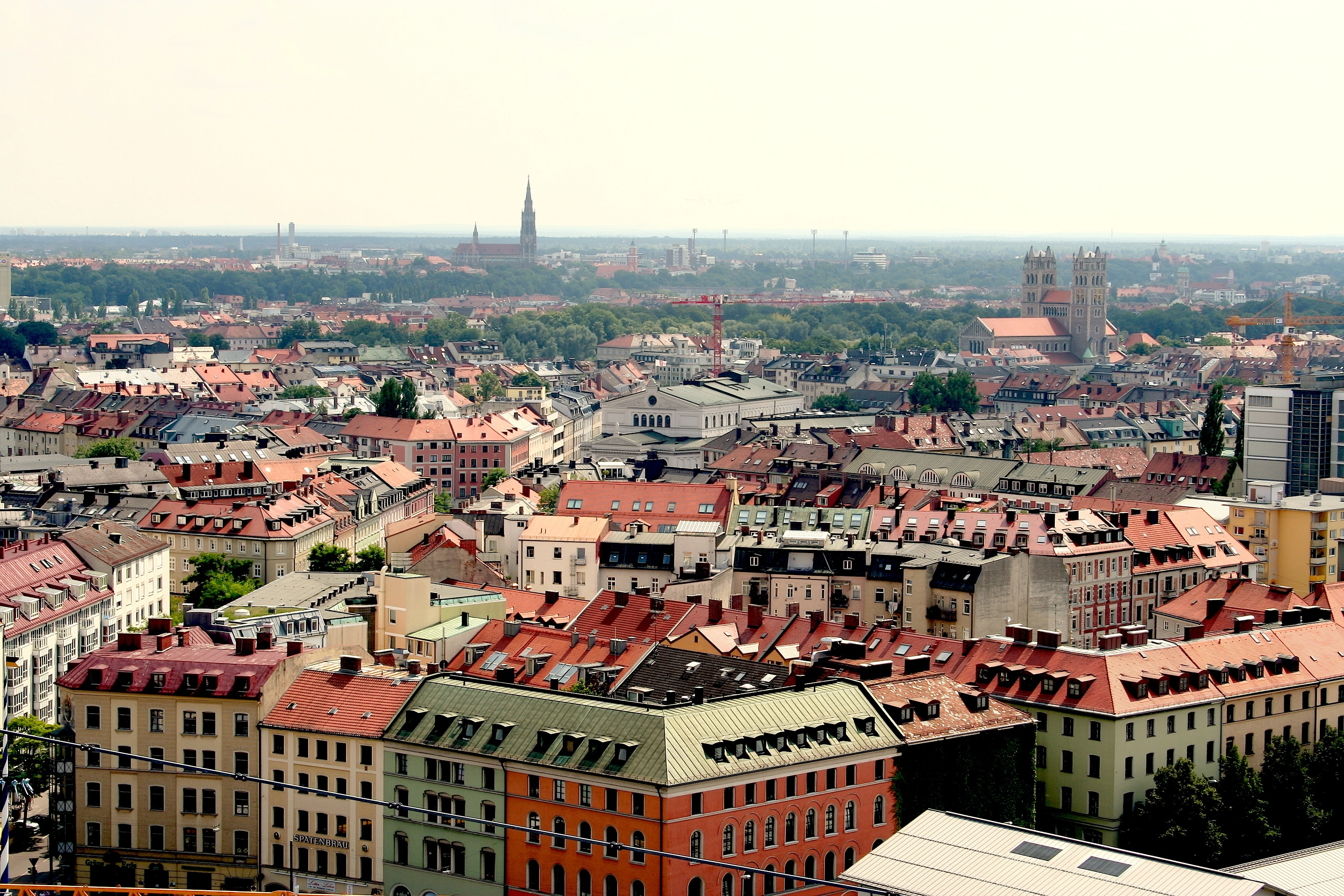
Isarvorstadt (Gärtnerplatzviertel)

The Ludwigsvorstadt district encompasses the quarters of St. Paul and Ludwigsvorstadt-Kliniken, while the district of Isarvorstadt is composed of the Schlachthofviertel, Drei-Mühlen-Viertel, Am alten Südfriedhof, the Glockenbachviertel, the Gärtnerplatzviertel, and Am Deutschen Museum.

=== St. Paul ===
The St. Paul quarter, located immediately to the East of the Theresienwiese, the site of Munich's yearly Oktoberfest, is centered on St. Paul's Church, a neogothic Catholic church from the turn of the 20th century. St. Paul, especially along the Bavariaring, an orbital road circling Theresienwiese, and along the Kaiser-Ludwig-Platz, is considered one of Munich's more upscale neighbourhoods, although many residential buildings have since been converted to office space. The Goethestraße to the east serves as a divider between St. Paul and the neighbouring Ludwigsvorstadt/Kliniken quarter.

The quarter is served by the U4 and U5 subway lines at Theresienwiese station in the north and U3 and U6 lines at Goetheplatz and Poccistraße stations. On the northern edge of the quarter, the tramway lines 18 and 19 call along Bayerstraße.

=== Ludwigsvorstadt/Kliniken ===
The wider Ludwigsvorstadt area is characterized by three distinct areas: Bahnhofsviertel, Wiesnviertel, and Klinikviertel The Bahnhofsviertel is located directly south of Munich Hauptbahnhof, the city's main train station. It has popularly been called Little Istanbul, because of the concentration of Turkish supermarkets, eateries, and shops along Landwehrstraße and Goethestraße. The south of the quarter is dominated by the Klinikum Innenstadt, one of the major hospitals attached to LMU Munich. However, the LMU Klinikum is gradually expanding and relocating some of its facilities to the Großhadern campus, a borough in the south-west of Munich, and to convert the former hospital buildings to residential and office developments. Given its proximity to Munich's Old Town, the hospital buildings are considered prime developing space. The Nußbaumpark is located near Lindwurmstraße, between Ziemssenstraße and Nußbaumstraße. The area is served by subway lines U3, U6, U1, and U2 at the Sendlinger Tor interchange.

=== Am Schlachthof ===
The Schlachthofviertel takes its name from the City of Munich's slaughterhouse, located in the east of the quarter. While slaughtering is no longer the main focus on the Schlachthof, the area is still home to a large number of butchers and food emporiums.

It is bounded to the north-west by Lindwurmstraße, to the north by Kapuzinerstraße, to the east by Thalkirchner Straße, and to the south by the railway tracks of the Deutsche Bahn South Ring.

Increasingly, the space around the Schlachthof has been taken up by up-start small businesses and artists. Each year, the Schlachthof hosts "Open Schlachthof", where artists open their ateliers to passers-by and display their art on the street. A small residential quarter is sandwiched between the Schlachthof and Lindwurmstraße to the west.

The area is served by the U3 and U6 lines at Goetheplatz and Poccistraße stations as well as local bus services along Lagerhausstraße, Thalkirchner Straße, and Kapuzinerstraße.

The headquarters of the Munich branch of the Arbeitsamt federal employment agency is located along Kapuzinerstraße.

=== Dreimühlenviertel ===
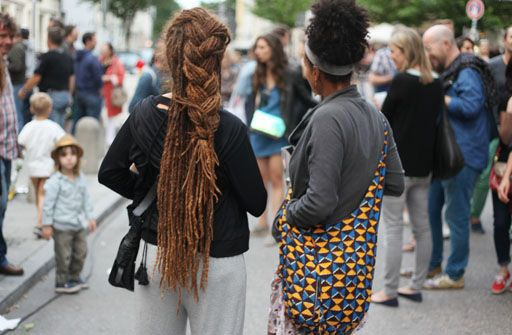
Street festival, Dreimühlenstreet, 2015

The Dreimühlenviertel is located directly to the east of the Schlachthofviertel and is bounded by the railway tracks to the south, the River Isar to the east, and the Kapuzinerstraße to the north. It is residential in character, although numerous bars, cafés, and restaurants are located along Ehrengutstraße and Roecklplatz.

There is no subway station in the immediate vicinity, although the Metrobus on Kapuzinerstraße serves both Goetheplatz and Kolumbusplatz stations, located across the river.

=== Am alten Südfriedhof ===
This quarter is located east of Lindwurmstraße and north of Kapuzinerstraße. In the east, it is bounded by the Alter Südfriedhof (lit. "Old Southern Cemetery"), where numerous illustrious Münchner are buried. The quarter is residential in character, although on the north end of Thalkirchner Straße, towards Sendlinger Tor, there are a few bars and restaurants. The closest subway station is Sendlinger Tor, in the north of the quarter.

=== Glockenbachviertel ===
It is often claimed that the Glockenbachviertel is the heart of Isarvorstadt. Indeed, it is the most vibrant part of the borough, with bars, restaurants, and nightclubs straddling Blumenstraße, Müllerstraße, Hans-Sachs-Straße, and Klenzestraße. The Glockenbachviertel, together with the adjacent Gärtnerplatzviertel, is also the focal point of Munich's gay culture, with gay bars and clubs located primarily along Müllerstraße. The official dividing line between the two quarters is the Fraunhoferstraße. The nearest subway stations are Sendlinger Tor and Fraunhoferstraße.

=== Gärtnerplatzviertel ===
Gärtnerplatz

The centrepiece of this quarter is the eponymous Gärtnerplatz, a landscaped urban square arranged as a roundabout. The square is home to cafés, bars, The Seven, and the Staatstheater am Gärtnerplatz, one of Munich's prime theatre locations.

=== Am Deutschen Museum ===
Publicly seen as part of the Gärtnerplatzviertel, Am Deutschen Museum encompasses the western shore of the River Isar and the Museumsinsel, an island in the river where the world-famous Deutsches Museum is located, as well as the Blitz Club. The tramway line 18 crosses the river there, and the nearest S-Bahn station is Isartor.

=== Gallery ===
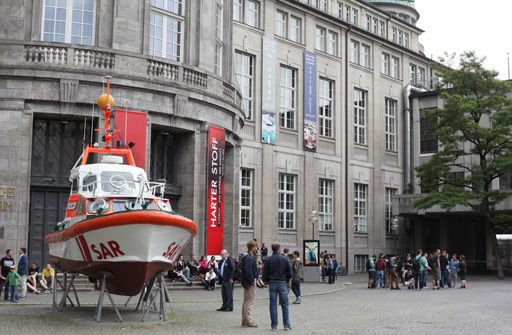
Deutsches Museum

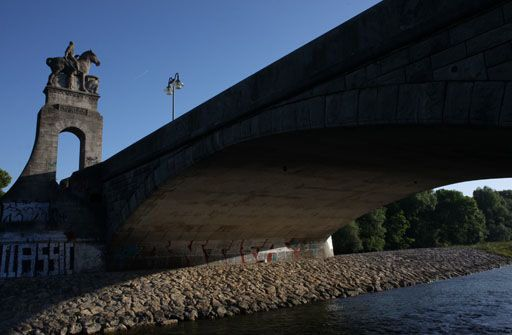
Wittelsbacherbrücke

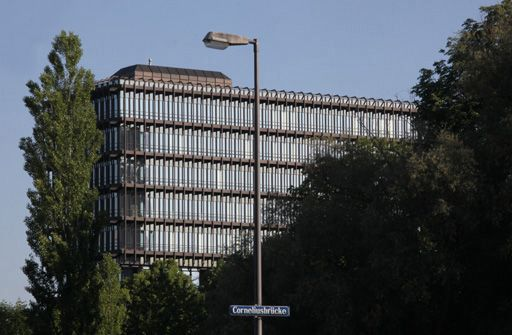
Europäisches Patentamt

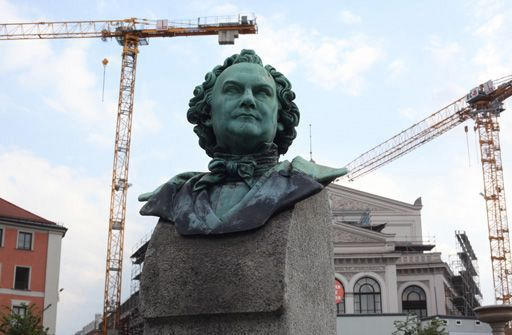
Gärtnerplatz

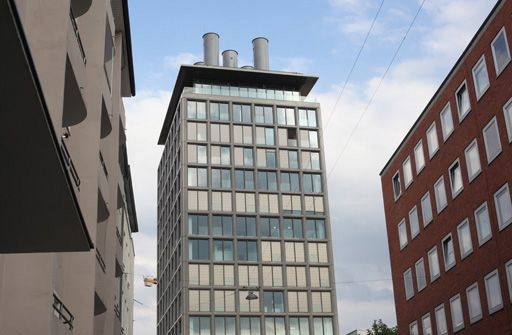
The seven

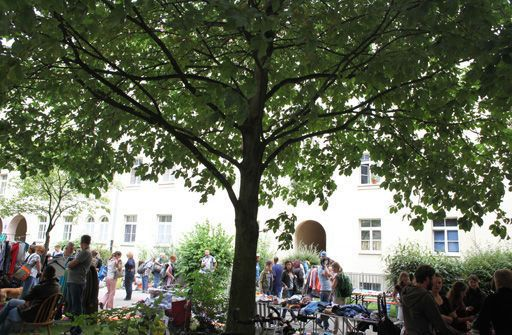
Flea market Dreimühlenstraße

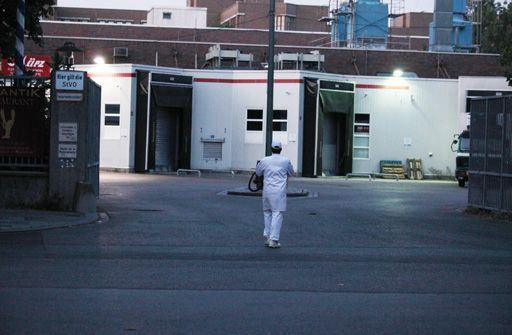
Entrance area slaughterhouse

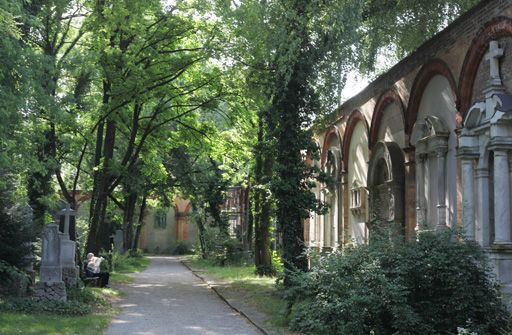
Alter Südfriedhof

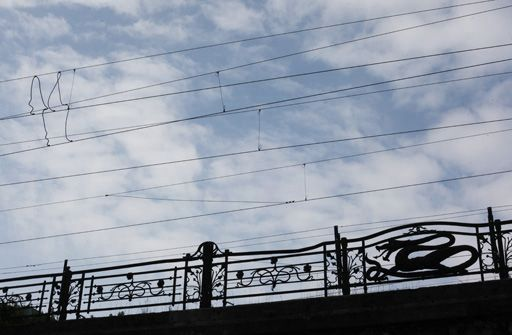
Lindwurmstraße
