= Implerstraße station =

Station of the Munich U-Bahn

Implerstraße
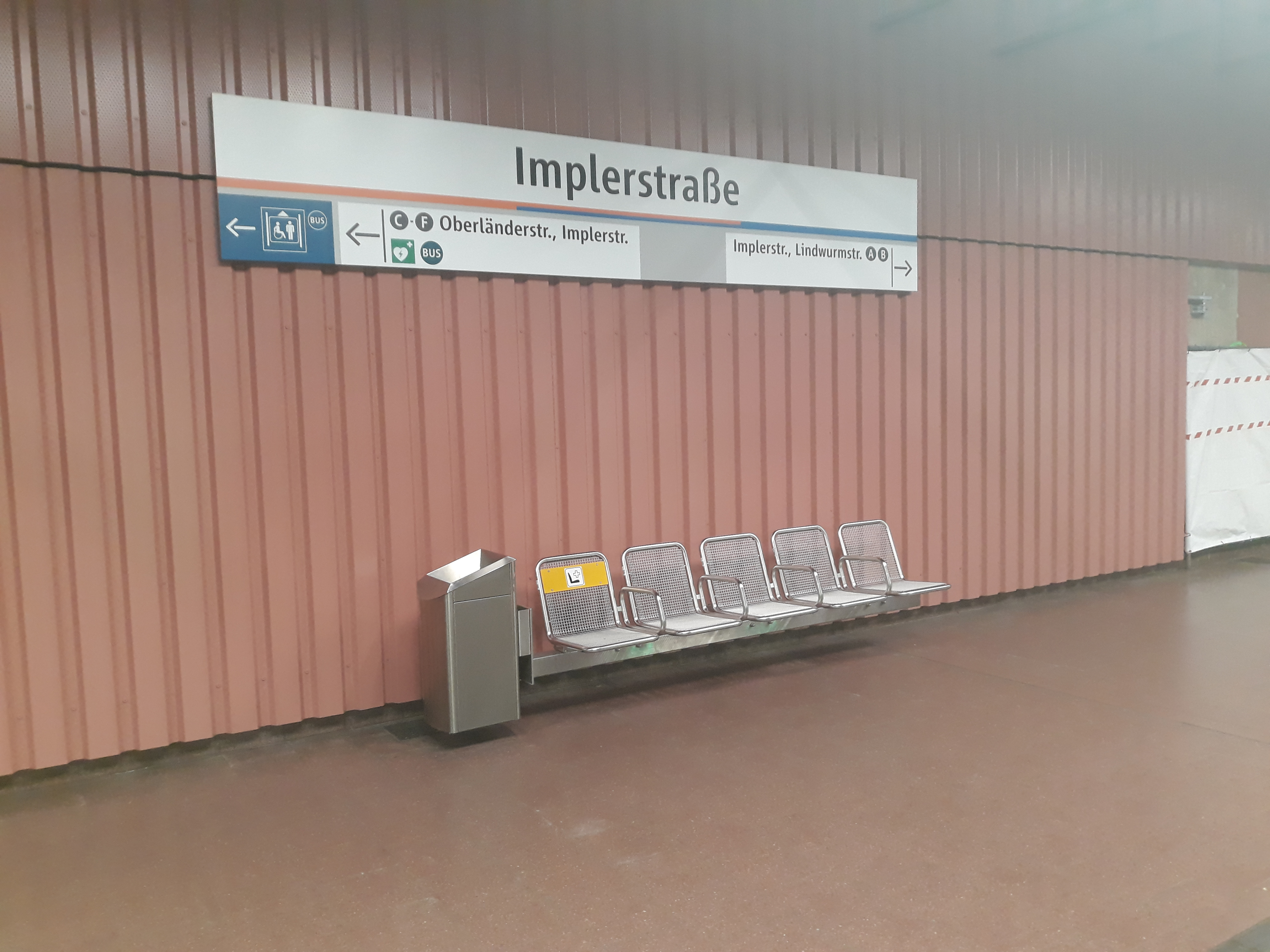

General information
- Location: Implerstraße, Sendling; Munich, Germany
- Coordinates: 48°07′12″N 11°32′54″E
- Platforms: 1 Island platform 1 Side platform
- Tracks: 3

Construction
- Structure type: Underground
- Accessible: Yes

Other information
- Fare zone: : M

History
- Opened: 22 November 1975

Services
| Preceding station | Munich U-Bahn | Following station |
|---|---|---|
| Brudermühlstraße towards Fürstenried West | U3 | Poccistraße towards Moosach |
| Harras towards Klinikum Großhadern | U6 | Poccistraße towards Garching-Forschungszentrum |
Location

Implerstraße is an U-Bahn station in Munich on the and the.
