= Joseph von Lindwurm =

Joseph von Lindwurm (9 April 1824 – 21 February 1874), was a German medical doctor and dermatologist born in Aschaffenburg.

He studied medicine in Würzburg and Heidelberg, obtaining his medical doctorate in 1849. Afterwards, he worked as an assistant in the medical clinic at Würzburg, then furthered his education in Vienna and Paris. In Paris, he demonstrated through inoculation experiments that secondary syphilis was as contagious as primary syphilis. In 1853 he became privat-docent at Munich, followed by an associate professorship several years later (1859). In 1863 he was appointed a full professor of dermatology and venereal diseases in Munich, later becoming director of the second medical clinic at the general hospital (1869).

A thoroughfare in Munich, Lindwurmstraße, is named in his honor. His surname refers to the "Lindwurm" of German mythology.

== Publications ==
Among his written works was a translation of William Stokes' "The Diseases of the Heart and Aorta" into German (Handbuch der Krankheiten des Herzens und der Aorta). Other writings by Lindwurm are:

- Über die Verschiedheit der syphilitischen Krankheiten, in: Würzburger medizinische Zeitschrift 1862, S. 143-177 - On the diversity of syphilitic diseases.
- Notwendigkeit der Zwangsrevaccination, in: Ärztliches Intelligenzblatt 1972, S. 134-135 - Necessity for mandatory re-vaccinations.

Books about Joseph von Lindwurm

- Joseph von Lindwurm (1824-1874): eine Biographie by Ulrike Elga Elisabeth Riemensperger, 1982.
