= St. Paul's Church, Munich =

Catholic church in Munich, Germany

Coordinates: 48°08′11″N 11°33′08″E

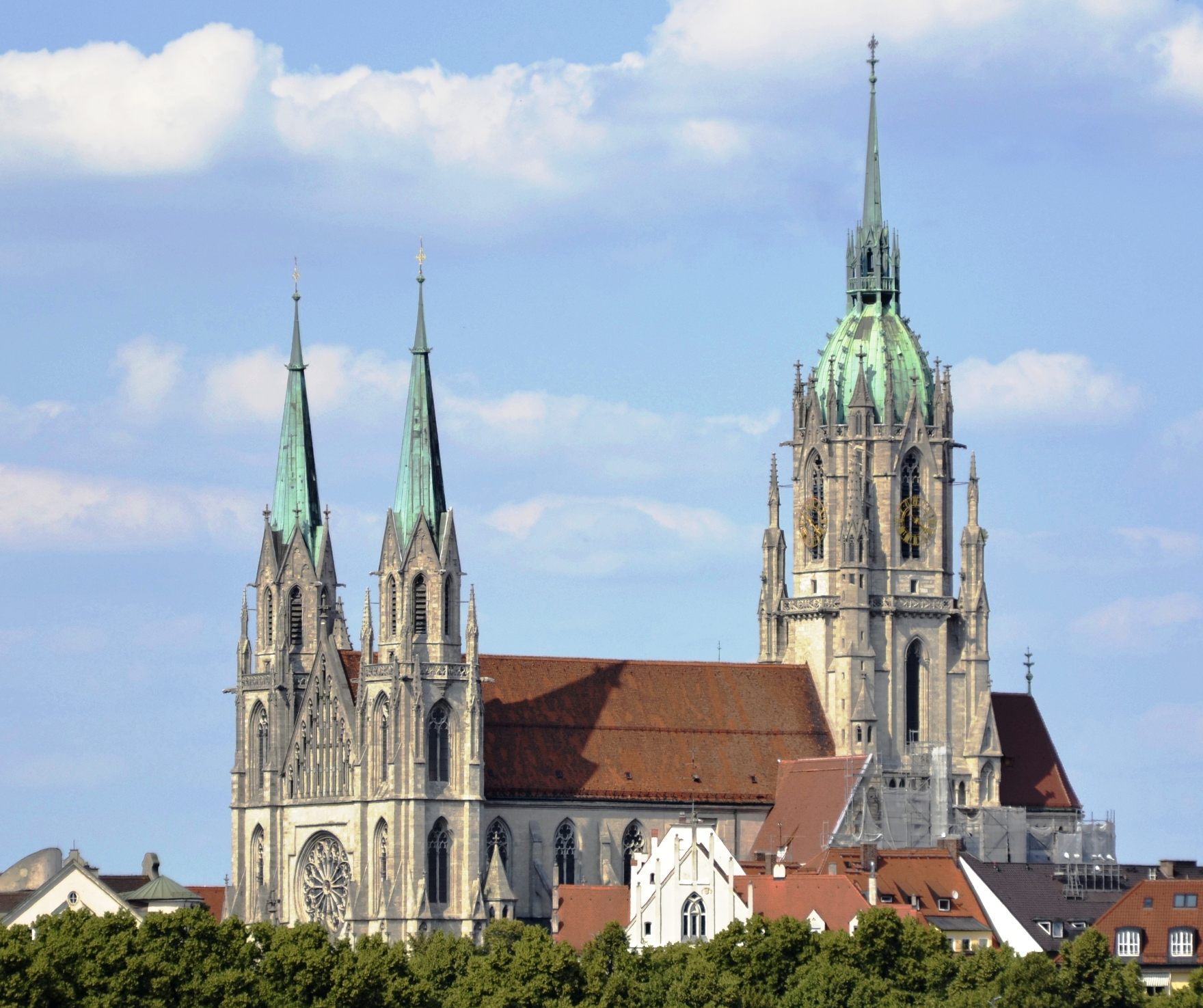
St. Paul's Church, Munich

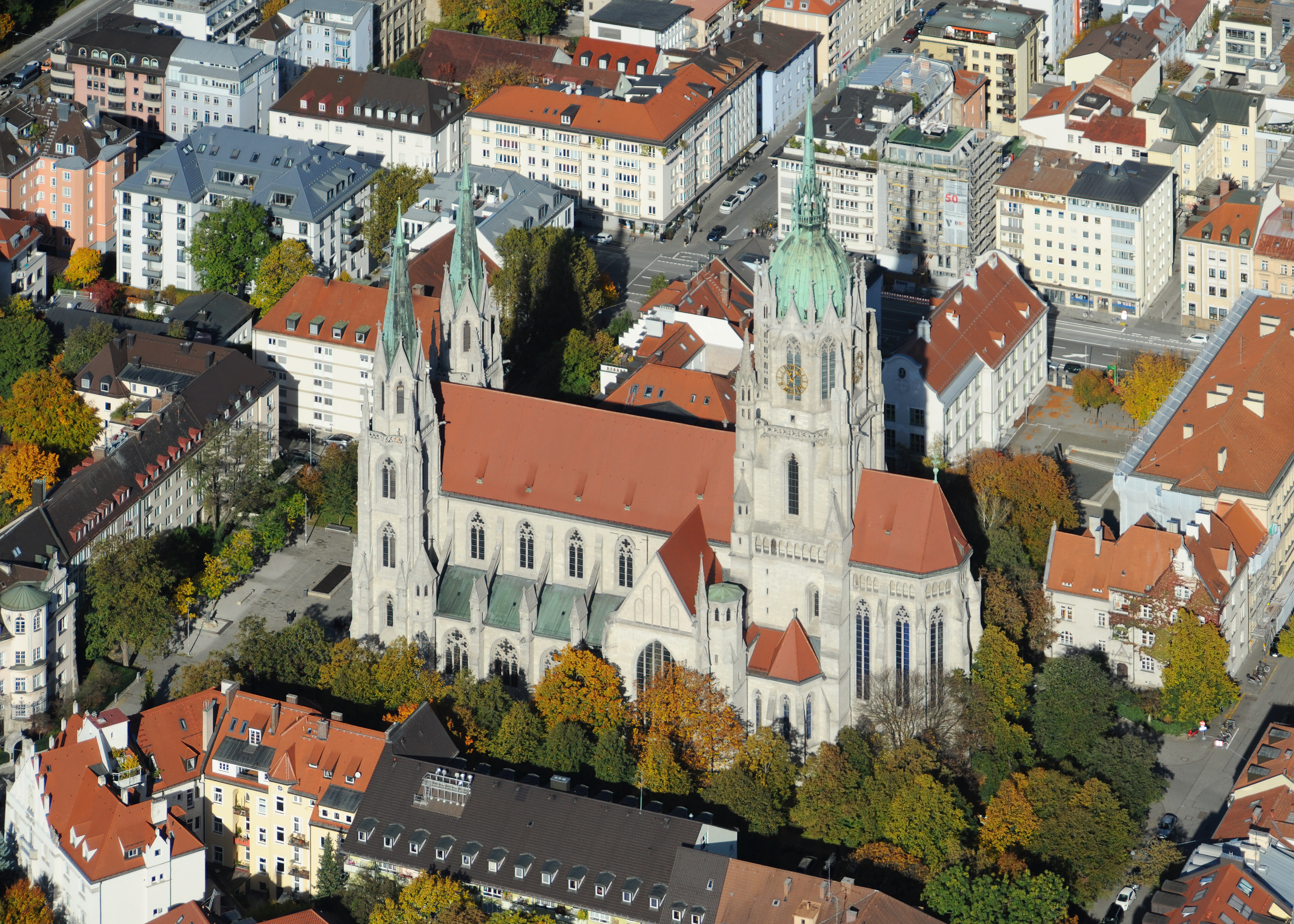
Aerial view

St. Paul's Church (German: St Paul or Paulskirche) is a large Catholic church in the Ludwigsvorstadt-Isarvorstadt quarter of Munich, Bavaria, Germany. It was built in 1892–1906, designed by the Austrian architect Georg von Hauberrisser in the Gothic Revival style, north of the Theresienwiese.

== Architecture ==
The construction consists mainly of limestone from Ansbach for the exterior cladding. Upper Bavarian tuff was used for the interior, and the core of the masonry consists of brick. The height of the main tower is 97 meters; its model was the tower of the Frankfurt Cathedral. The two western towers are 76 meters high. The west facade is decorated by a large rose window above the main entrance.

== History ==
During World War II, St Paul's was heavily damaged by air raids, especially in December 1944, with large pieces of equipment were lost, including the high altar.

On 17 December 1960, a Convair C-131D Samaritan crashed after striking the 318-foot tall steeple of St Paul's Church shortly after take-off from Munich-Riem Airport.
