= Lindwurmstraße =

Street in Munich, Germany

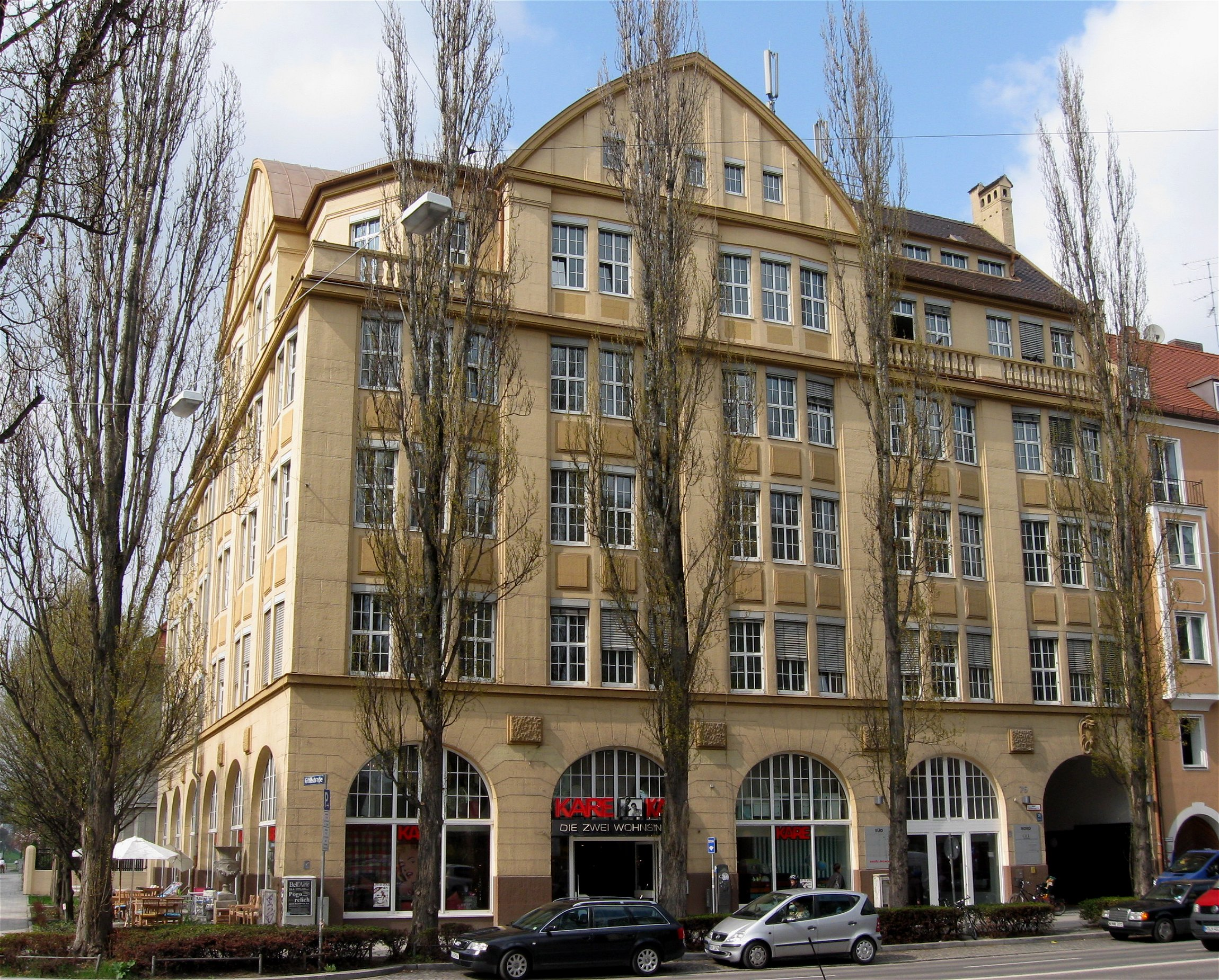
- Lindwurmstraße 76

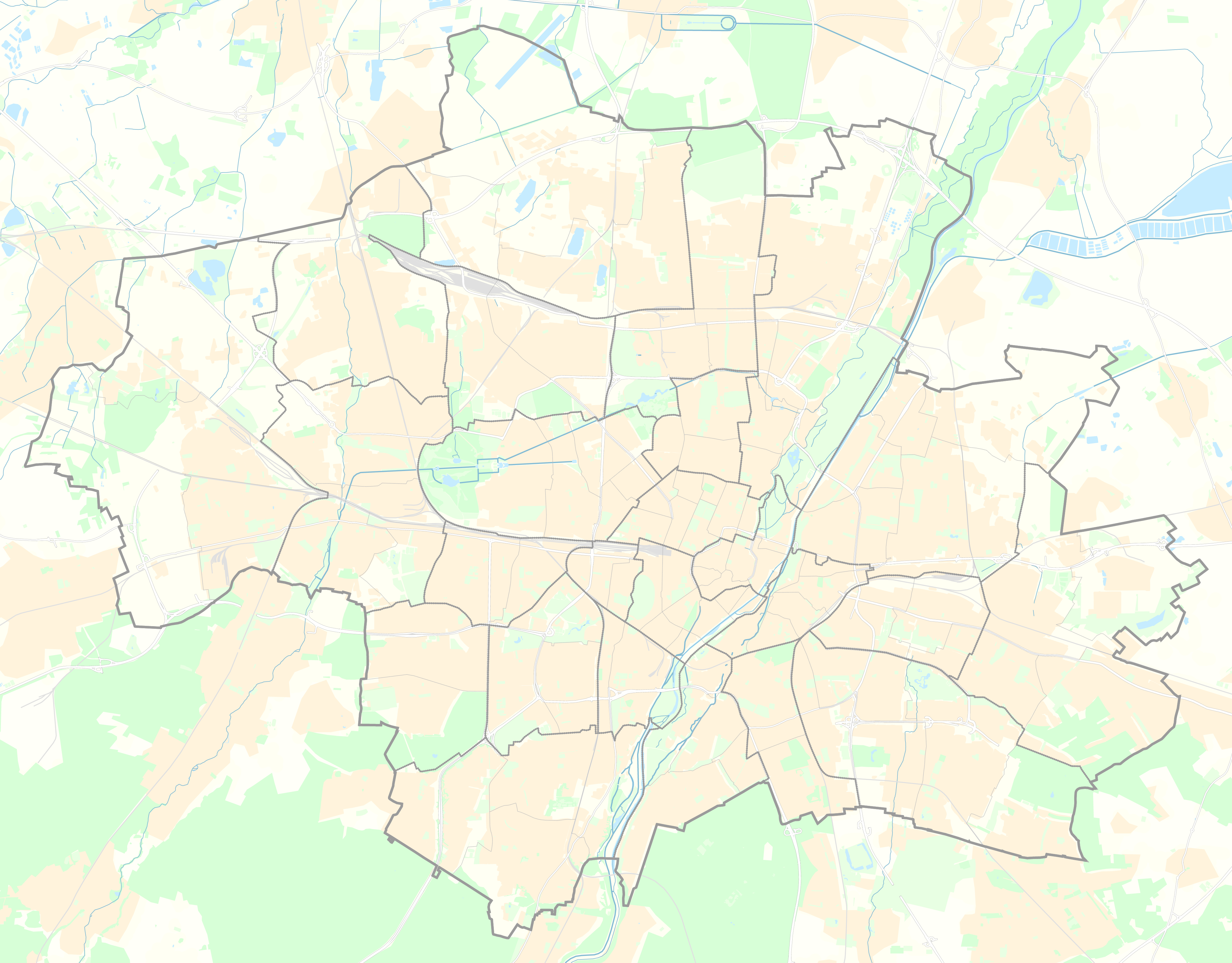
- Location within Munich
- Namesake: Joseph von Lindwurm
- Length: 2,400 m (7,900 ft)
- Location: Munich
- Nearest metro station: Poccistraße (U3, U6)
- Coordinates: 48.124115°N 11.548137°E
- Major junctions: Poccistraße, Implerstraße, Münchner Südring, Pfeuferstraße

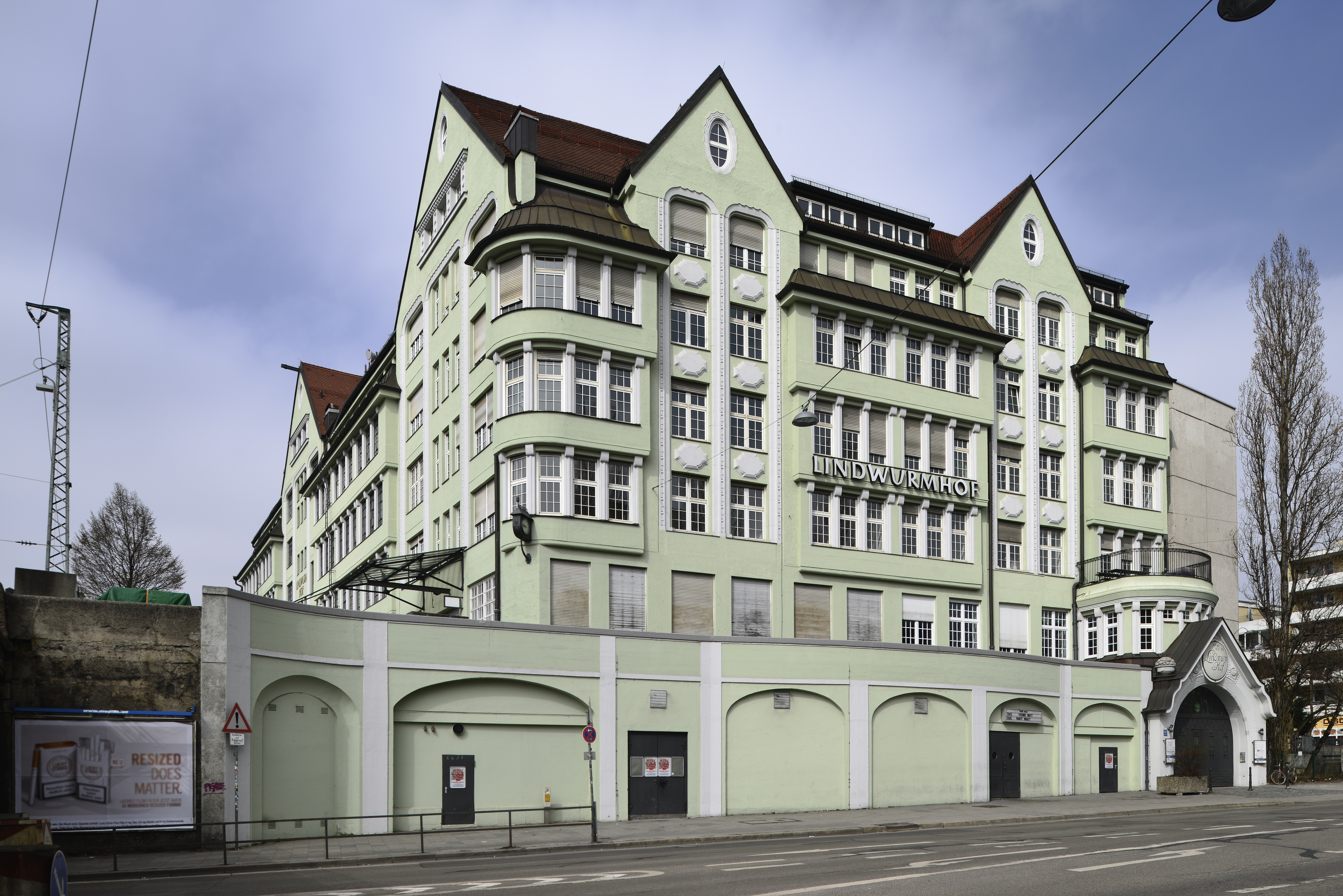
Lindwurmhof, Lindwurmstraße 88

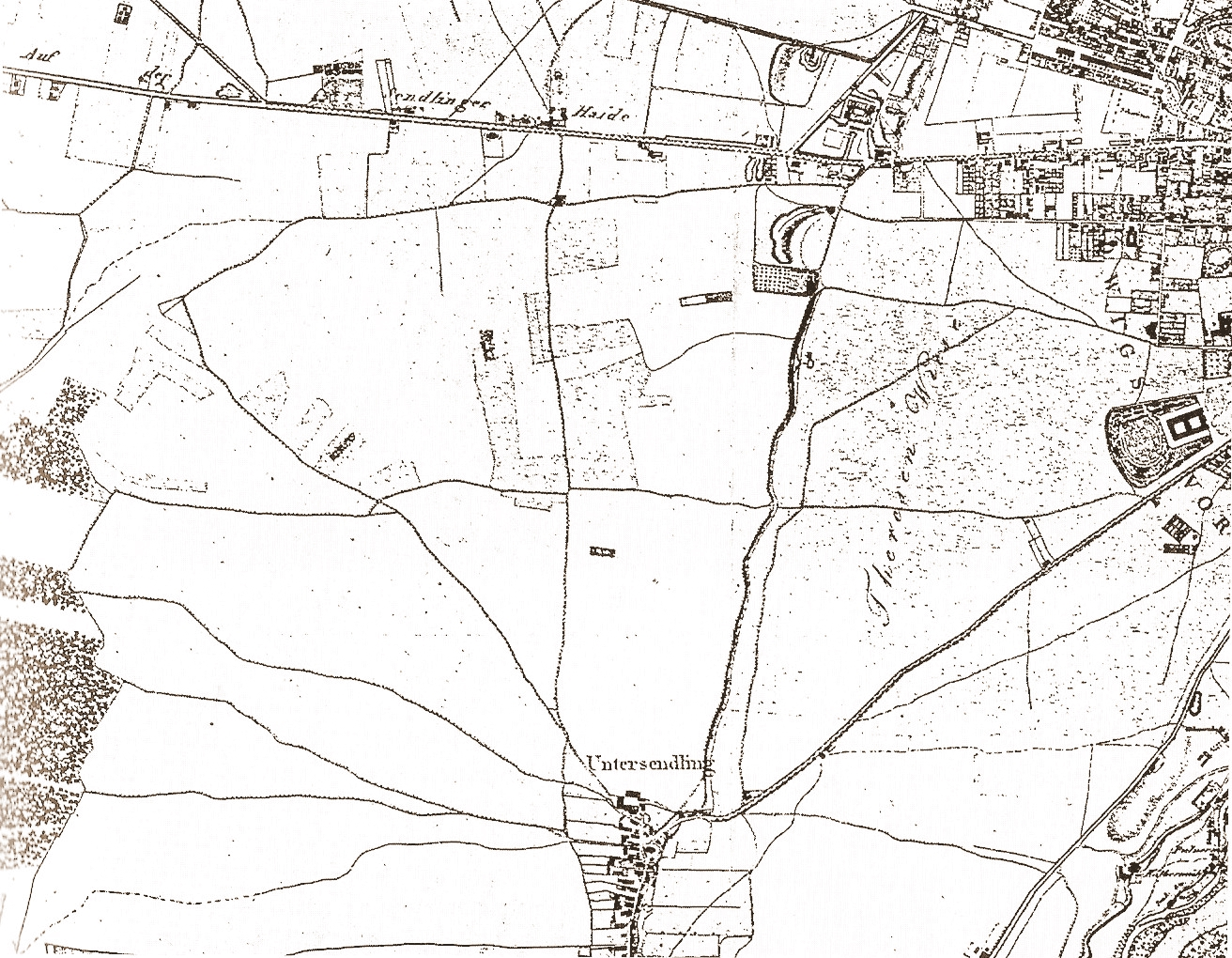
Route on the historical map of 1812

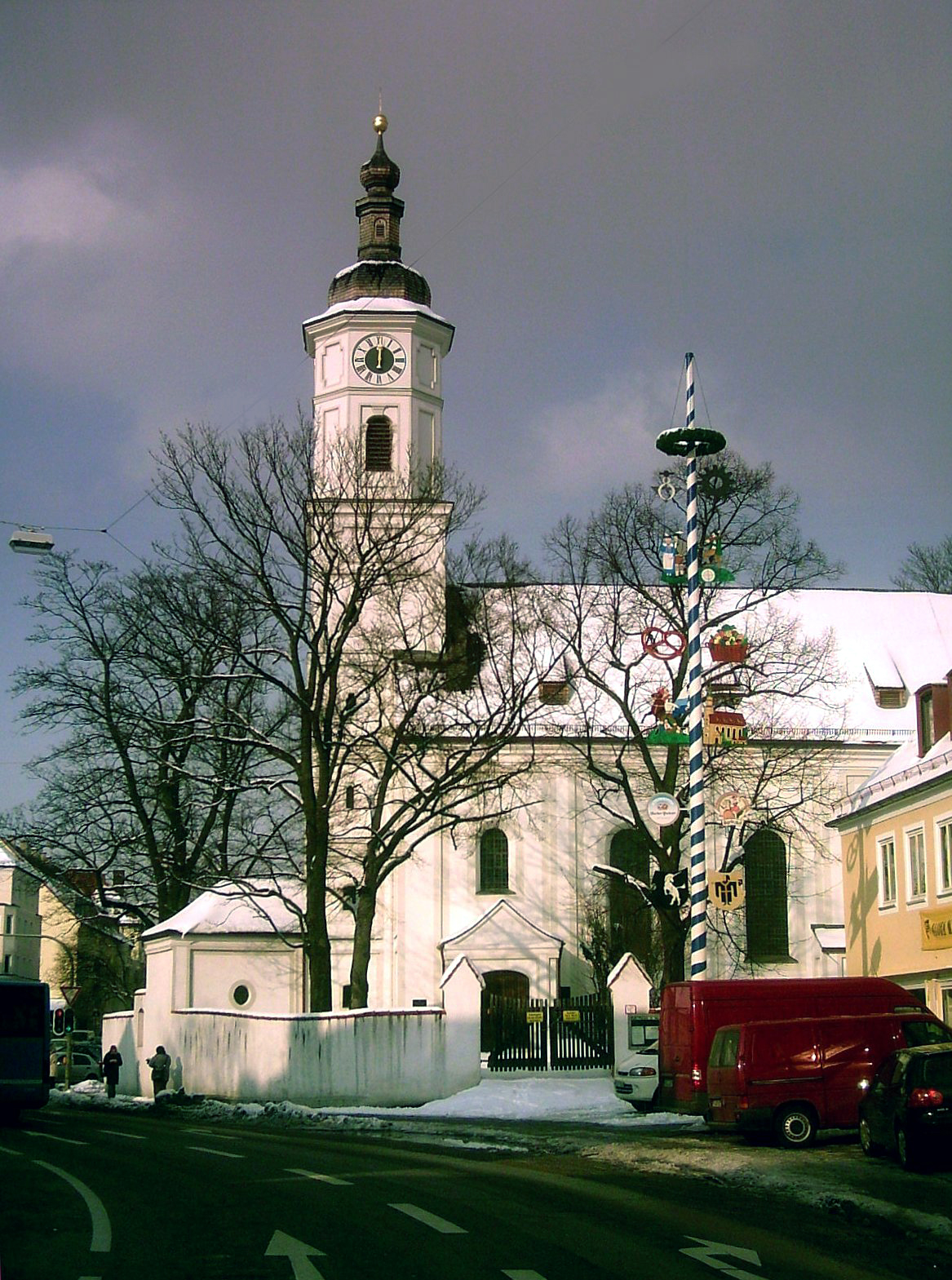
St. Margaret

The Lindwurmstraße is a 2.4-kilometer poplar alley in the Munich districts Ludwigsvorstadt-Isarvorstadt and Sendling.

== Location and Route ==
The Lindwurmstraße runs one kilometer to the northwest, parallel to the Isar and mostly just at an altitude of about 520 m above sea level from the Sendlinger Tor in a southwesterly direction. Between Poccistraße and Implerstraße, it passes under the Münchner Südring, a railway line that connects Bahnhof München Ost with München Hauptbahnhof and the Laim shunting yard to the south of the city center. Only shortly before its southern end in Munich-Sendling, it rises to the Pfeuferstraße at 534 m above sea level.

Well-known occupants are, umong others, the Klinikum Großhadern, the Haunersche Kinderspital as well as the churches St. Matthäus and St. Margaret.

== History ==
The Bavarian archival cadaster shows the Lindwurmstraße in the 1810s as a then, nameless Chaussee, that leads past the Burgfriedstein Nr. 2 to Untersendling, with a mutually planned tree planted route. In the 1860s, it was crossed by the railway line and on its northeaster route direction was a nameless street village.

It was formerly called Sendlinger Landstraße. The Alte Straße nach Sendling (old road to Sendling) was renamed in 1878 after the physician Joseph von Lindwurm (1824-1874, dermatologist and chief physician).

House No. 127 (then 125), now a branch of the Munich Adult Education Center, served as an emergency shelter for the Jewish religious community because the National Socialists had demolished the synagogue and community buildings on Herzog-Max-Straße. In 1941, the occupants were deported.

The Lindwurmstraße today, is a place of the cultural history trail Ludwigsvorstadt-Isarvorstadt.

== Historical building monuments ==
Numerous buildings along the Lindwurmstraße are protected as historical monuments, for example:

- Lindwurmstraße 2a, II. Women's Hospital of the University, New Baroque construction from 1915/16
- Lindwurmstraße 4, Haunersches children's hospital, classical building of 1923/24
- Lindwurmstraße 6, part of the post office at Goetheplatz from 1931/32
- Lindwurmstraße 19, Augsburgerstraße 23 Historical five-storey corner building erected by Franz Xaver Mayr, 1831
- Lindwurmstraße 46, post-classical residential building from 1911 on the foundation from 1886
- Lindwurmstraße 76, state commercial building, an Art Nouveau corner building from 1911/12
- Lindwurmstraße 88, Lindwurmhof, a monumental Art Nouveau commercial building from 1910/11
- Lindwurmstraße 205, residential building, built in 1897 (German Renaissance)

== Art ==
- Baumzeichen 2 (Tree depiction 2), 7.2 m high bronze sculpture by Karl Jakob Schwalbach in front of the Municipality of Munich
- The Smith of Kochel monument by architect Carl Sattler and sculptor Carl Ebbinghaus (1906-1911)

== Traffic ==
The Lindwurmstraße is four-lane road for traffic and has bike paths designated in both directions which are lined with tall poplars.

Public transport connects the street at the subway stations Sendlinger Tor, Goetheplatz and Poccistraße with the lines U3 and U6. Furthermore, the bus lines 62 and 132 as well as, the night bus lines N 40, N 41 and N 45, run there on partial routes.
