= Schwanthalerhöhe station =

Station of the Munich U-Bahn

Coordinates: 48°08′02″N 11°32′28″E

Schwanthalerhöhe
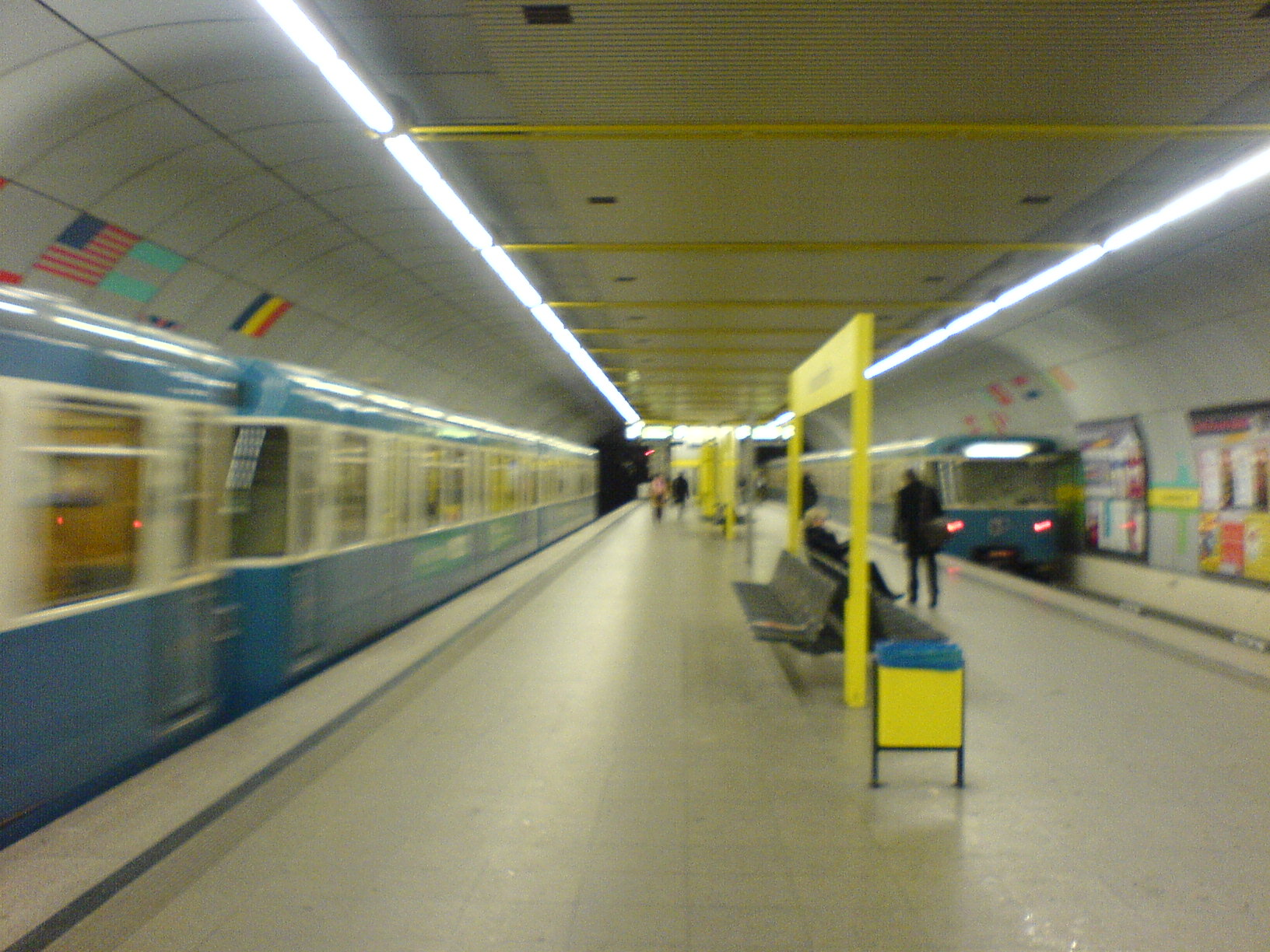
- Schwanthalerhöhe platform

General information
- Location: Schwanthalerhöhe; Munich, Germany
- Platforms: Island platform
- Tracks: 2

Construction
- Structure type: Underground
- Accessible: Yes

Other information
- Fare zone: : M

Services
Preceding station	Munich U-Bahn	Following station
Heimeranplatz towards Westendstraße	U4	Theresienwiese towards Arabellapark
Heimeranplatz towards Laimer Platz	U5	Theresienwiese towards Neuperlach Süd
Location

Schwanthalerhöhe is a Munich U-Bahn station in Munich on the U4 and U5 lines of the Munich U-Bahn system.

== See also ==
- List of Munich U-Bahn stations
