= The Seven (Munich) =

Real estate project in Munich, Germany

Coordinates: 48.131873°N 11.573544°E

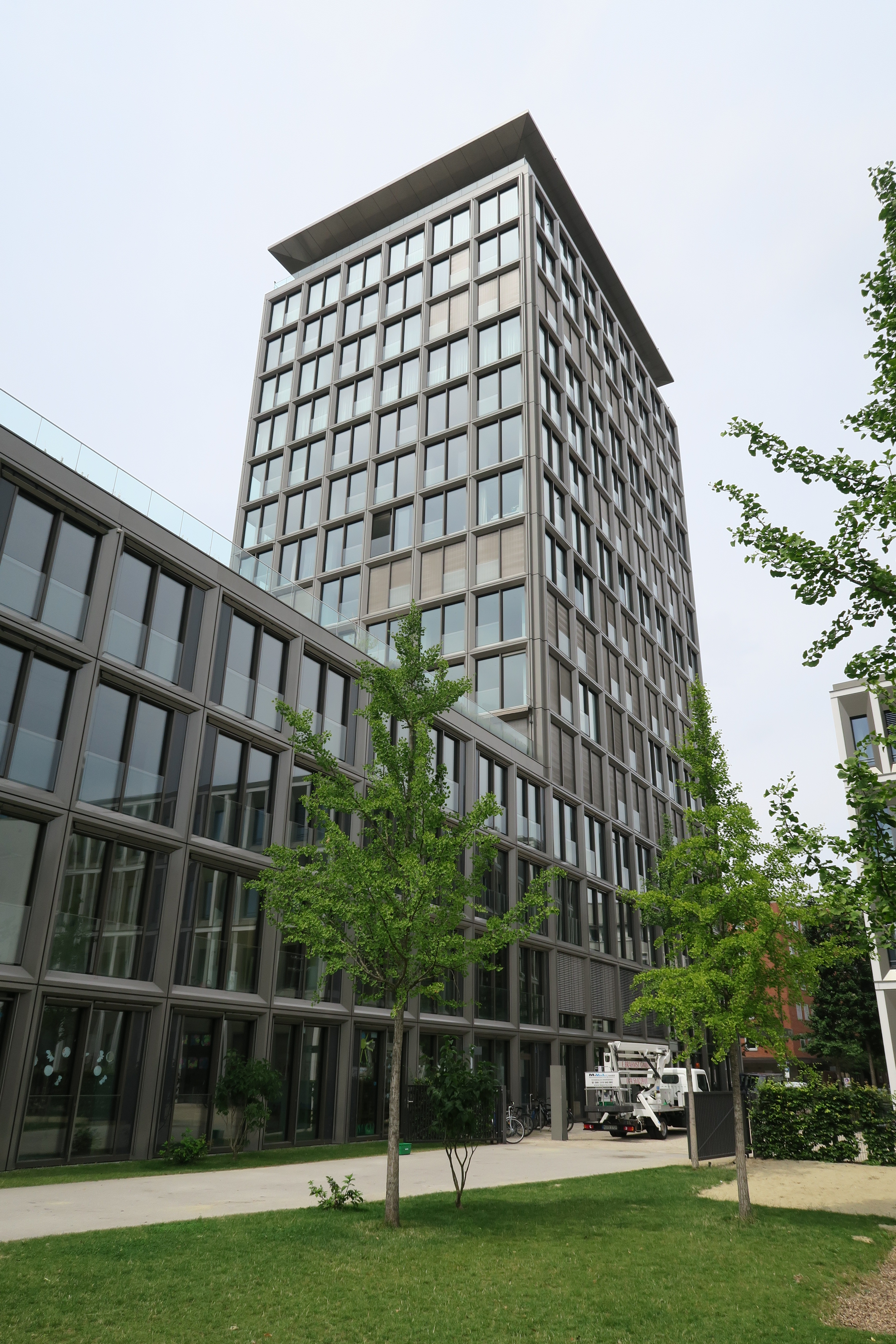
The Seven

The Seven is a real estate project in the Munich Gärtnerplatz district, City area Ludwigsvorstadt-Isarvorstadt. In a former heating plant of the city of Munich, luxury properties were built.

According to media reports, these were "the most expensive apartments in the city". The former heating plant Müllerstraße in Müllerstraße 7 was sold by the Stadtwerke München. In the two top floors, a 700-square-meter penthouse with surrounding terrace and a 360-degree view has been created, at a cost of 14 million Euro.

The five chimneys remained from the buildings previous use. Alpha invest Projekt and LBBW Immobilien Capital, a subsidiary of Landesbank Baden-Württemberg, were involved. The object was designed by the Berlin architects Léon Wohlhage Wernick.

On the 14,000 square meter grounds, three complexes were built with 6,000 square meters of park area: an office and commercial complex along the Müllerstraße, a five-storey atrium building with about 80 apartments as well as the 54-meter-high former machine tower with 25 large luxury properties. It has a two story high entrance hall with a 24-hour Concierge and a gym. Since May 2014, the city of Munich is running a house for children, currently a nursery and kindergarten, in the complex. The underground car park is accessed via Corneliusstraße.

The housing prices, according to reports, range from 6,000 to 20,000 Euro per square meter, which was up to five times the average price of new properties in the state capital. As in other cities, there is also a debate on gentrification in Munich regarding such construction projects in the luxury segment. It is also the location of Munich's most expensive day care.
