= Goetheplatz station =

Station of the Munich U-Bahn

Goetheplatz
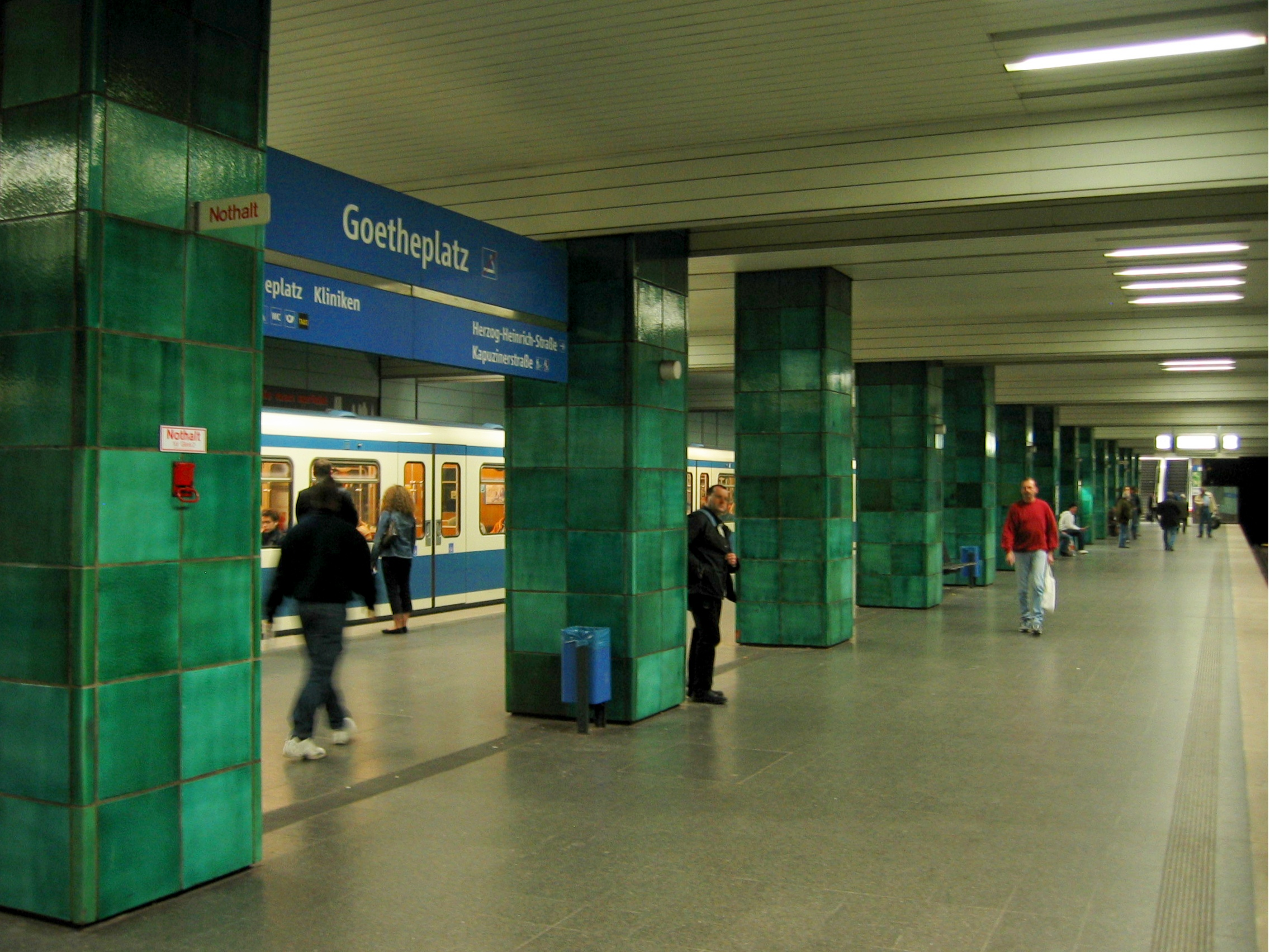

General information
- Location: Ludwigsvorstadt; Munich, Germany
- Coordinates: 48°07′45″N 11°33′28″E
- Platforms: Island platform
- Tracks: 2

Construction
- Structure type: Underground
- Accessible: Yes

Other information
- Fare zone: : M

History
- Opened: 19 October 1971

Services
Preceding station	Munich U-Bahn	Following station
Poccistraße towards Fürstenried West	U3	Sendlinger Tor towards Moosach
Poccistraße towards Klinikum Großhadern	U6	Sendlinger Tor towards Garching-Forschungszentrum
Location

Goetheplatz is a U-Bahn station in Munich, Germany, in operation since 19 October 1971. It is used by the U3 and U6 lines, for which it originally was the southern terminus.

== History ==
The tunnel from Sendlinger Tor to Goetheplatz (including the station) was completed between 1938 and 1941. It was originally part of a planned north–south S-Bahn line. However, construction was delayed due to World War II, that led to the tunnel being used as a bomb-shelter. This structural work was used later in the construction of the U-Bahn network.

The station has an unusual length of 135 metres (443 ft) and is longer than any other U-Bahn station. It is also one of the stations on Munich's U-Bahn network where classical music is played all day via loudspeakers.

The largest part of the station lies below Lindwurmstraße and only the northern end is beneath Goetheplatz. At both ends, an intermediate floor can be reached by escalators and stairs. Goetheplatz can be reached by a variety of exits including escalators and an elevator. However, at the southern end, only two relatively small staircases lead to both sides of Lindwurmstraße. On both intermediate floors, small kiosks can be found, with a bakery store on the northern side.

The interior design was planned by Paolo Nestler, who also designed other stations of the original U6 line. The walls behind the tracks consist of slate blue fibre cement boards through which a blue line is drawn (an indicator of the blue metro line). The columns have been covered with ceramic tiles of different shades of green. Light is provided by individual fluorescent tubes embedded in the ceiling panels, which is supposed to reflect from the stone plates inlaid with small pebbles from the Isar.
