= The Smith of Kochel =

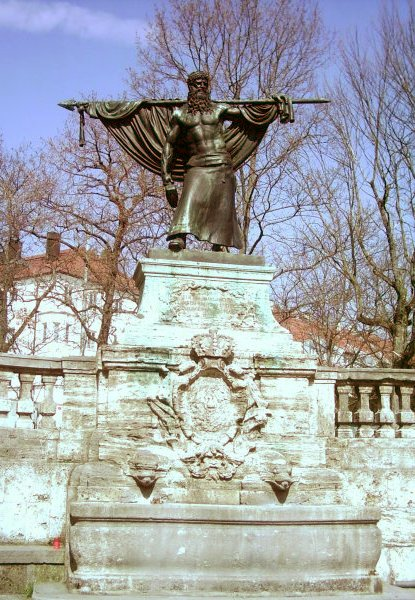
Memorial for the smith at Sendling (Munich), Lindwurmstraße opposite of Old Sendling Church St. Margareth

The Smith of Kochel (German: Der Schmied von Kochel) is a figure from Bavarian myth. According to this myth, he was a soldier in the Habsburg-Ottoman Wars (Battle of Vienna). Armed with nothing but a bar, he supposedly stoved in the gates of Belgrade. He refused rewards for his heroic deed from the prince electors.

Another legend attributed to him is leading the farmer rebellion against the imperial troops of the Habsburg Emperor Joseph I during the War of Spanish Succession. This culminated in Sendling's night of murder, also known as the Sendling Christmas Massacre. In literature, the smith is described as a man of over 70 years of age, yet great in stature and power. For the revolt, he supposedly armed himself with a spiked club of his own making that weighed over 100 lb (50 kg) . On the night of the massacre, the smith fought in the ranks of the rebels at the Sendling Parish Church. There he died heroically, the last man to fall.

== History ==
Historical research about the smith of Kochel has shown that he was probably only a legend and a symbol rather than a real person, possibly invented to make the defeat of the revolt more bearable. The smith is known as Balthasar with a last name of either Mayer or Riesenberger. A Balthasar Mayer (born January 6, 1644, in Waalkirchen) actually existed, but no evidence of this person being a smith in Kochel could be found. A Balthasar Riesenberger (born in Bach bei Holzolling) took part in the battle in Sendling, but no evidence of his being a smith in Kochel could be found either. The fact that Kochel belonged to the court district of Murnau at the time of the revolt, which did not take part in the Oberländer rebellion, also speaks against the Kochel theory. In memory of the Sendling Christmas Massacre and the Smith of Kochel, there are regular pageants and events in Bavaria.
