= Müllerstraße =

Street in Munich, Germany

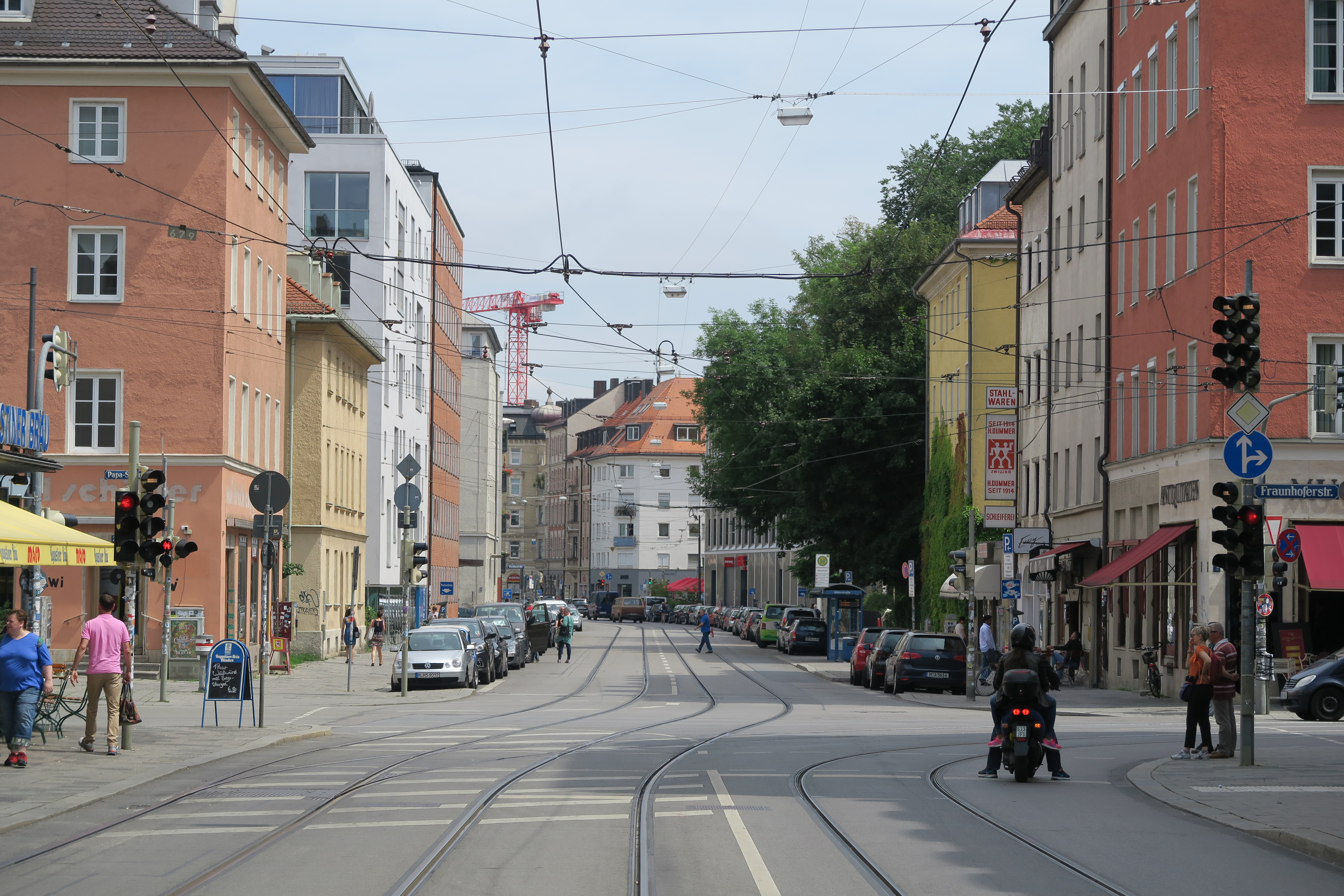
- Junction Müllerstraße and Fraunhoferstraße

- Location within Germany
- Length: 700 m (2,300 ft)
- Location: Munich
- Postal code: 80469
- Nearest metro station: Sendlinger Tor (U1, U2, U3, U4, U6, U7)
- Coordinates: 48.130921°N 11.570570°E

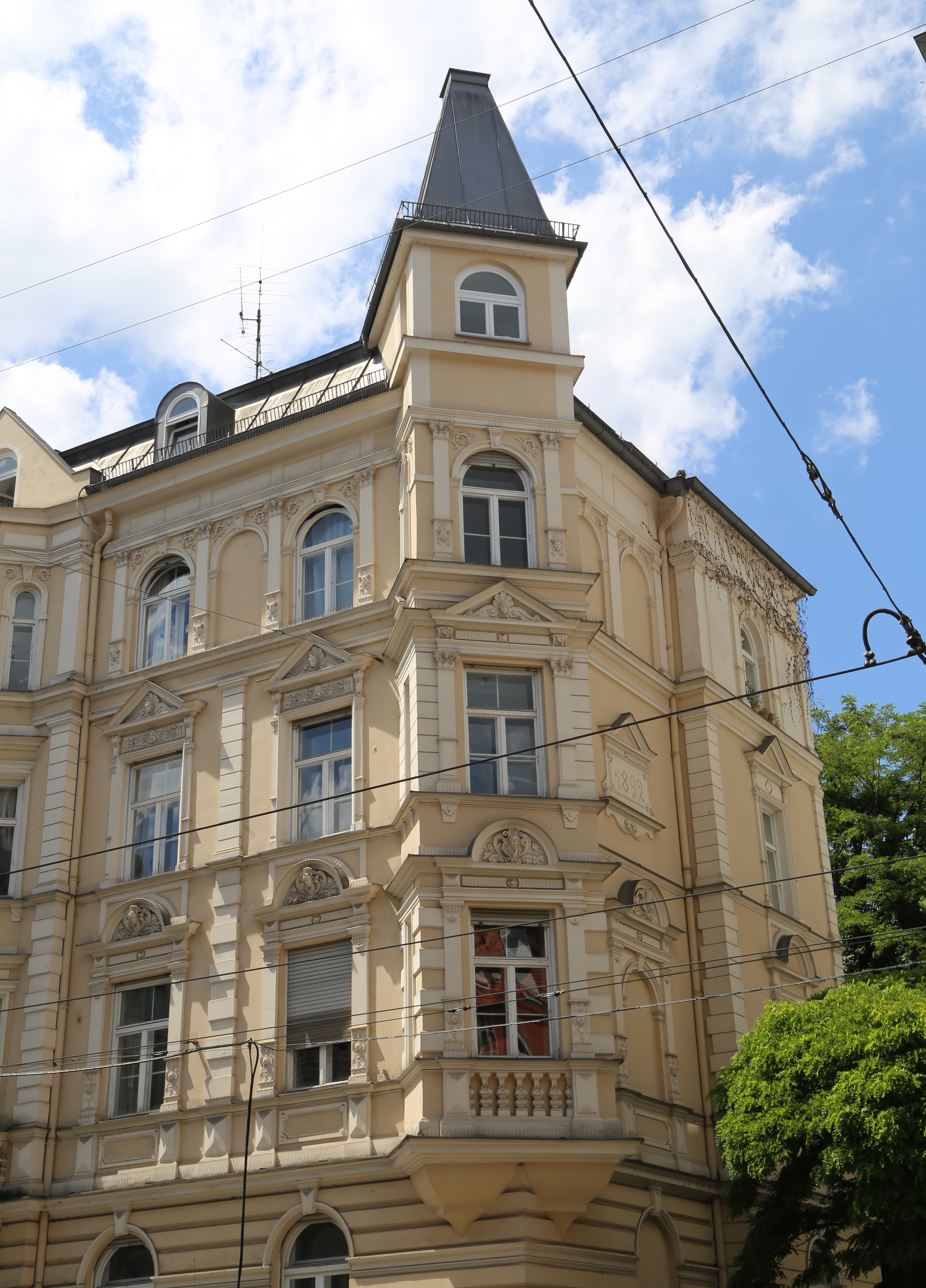
Müllerstraße 32

The Müllerstraße is a 700-meter-long street in the Munich Glockenbachviertel.

== Description ==
The Müllerstraße is considered the center of the Glockenbachviertel, and therefore a focal point of the Munich gay and lesbian scene, an art and gallery district and party mile. Recently, it is subject to gentrification, such as through The Seven (with a price per square meter of up to 22,000 euros) in the Müllerstraße 7 or numerous hipster shops.

The gay and lesbian communication and cultural center (SUB) has its counseling center at Müllerstraße 43. At number 11, there is a commemorative plaque for the poet Franz Stelzhamer. On the third floor of the building is the office of Little Teddy Recordings: Liam Lynch, Pete and the Pirates and Stereo Total have already released records under this label. In the street there are numerous clubs and bars, such as the Pimpernel, M. C. Müller, or the Ochsengarten, which opened in 1967 and is the first Leather-Bar in Germany, to which admission is reserved for men only. Freddie Mercury is known to have been seen there. Former clubs in the Müllerstraße were the gay club construction (with darkroom) and the bank. In the Müllerstraße 2–6 is the migration and cultural center Bellevue di Monaco, which opened in 2018. In Müllerstraße 14 is the Gay Outdoor Club Munich.

On Müllerstraße are the tram lines 16 and 18, and N27.

Müllerstraße is the location of the cultural history trail: Ludwigsvorstadt-Isarvorstadt.

== History ==
Müllerstraße is named after the numerous mills that were located on the, not yet dried, streams in front of the city in the 19th century. There was also the "women's outdoor pool in the bathhouse in the Müllerstraße" located on the stream.

Müllerstraße 40 is the location of the former "Optical Institute" by Joseph von Utzschneider, later in March, a palatial, classical building, richly structured and decorated, built in 1829 by Joseph Höchl; on the facade of the house is a statue of the Virgin Mary and a bust representing Fraunhofer and Utzschneider, which was created by Halbig and is inscribed with the year 1866.

At the Müllerstraße 7, at the location of "The Seven" the tower of an unused power plant was converted to Munich's most expensive apartments, on the grounds of which first stood the Bavarian military hospital and then until the destruction by bombs in 1944 the Luitpold-Gymnasium. Albert Einstein went to school there from 1888 to 1894. In the time of the Münchner Räterepublik (Munich Soviet Republic) in April 1919, the high school was the scene of violence, as the Red Army killed ten supporters of the folk Thule Society. The Free Corps retaliated in early May 1919 with merciless terror and multiple murders. In 1940/41, the Müllerstraße Hochbunker was built there, followed by the Müllerstraße heating plant in 1954-1956.

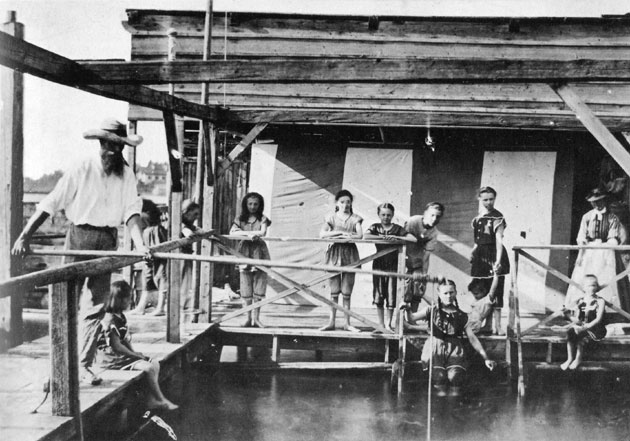
"Women's outdoor pool in the bathhouse in the Müllerstraße", 1880

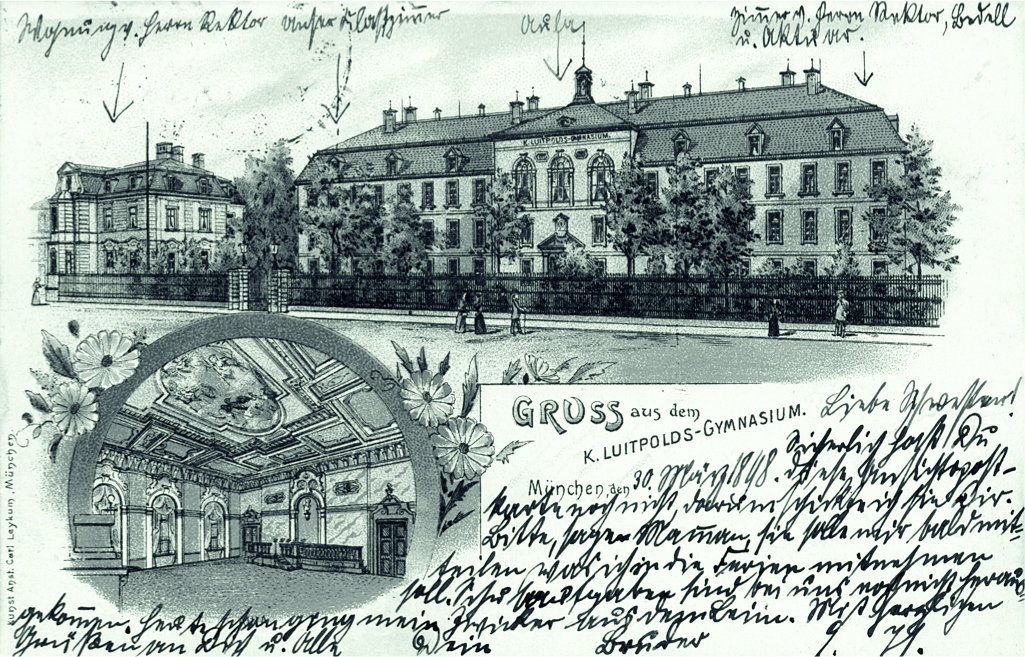
Luitpold-Gymnasium, postcard from 1848

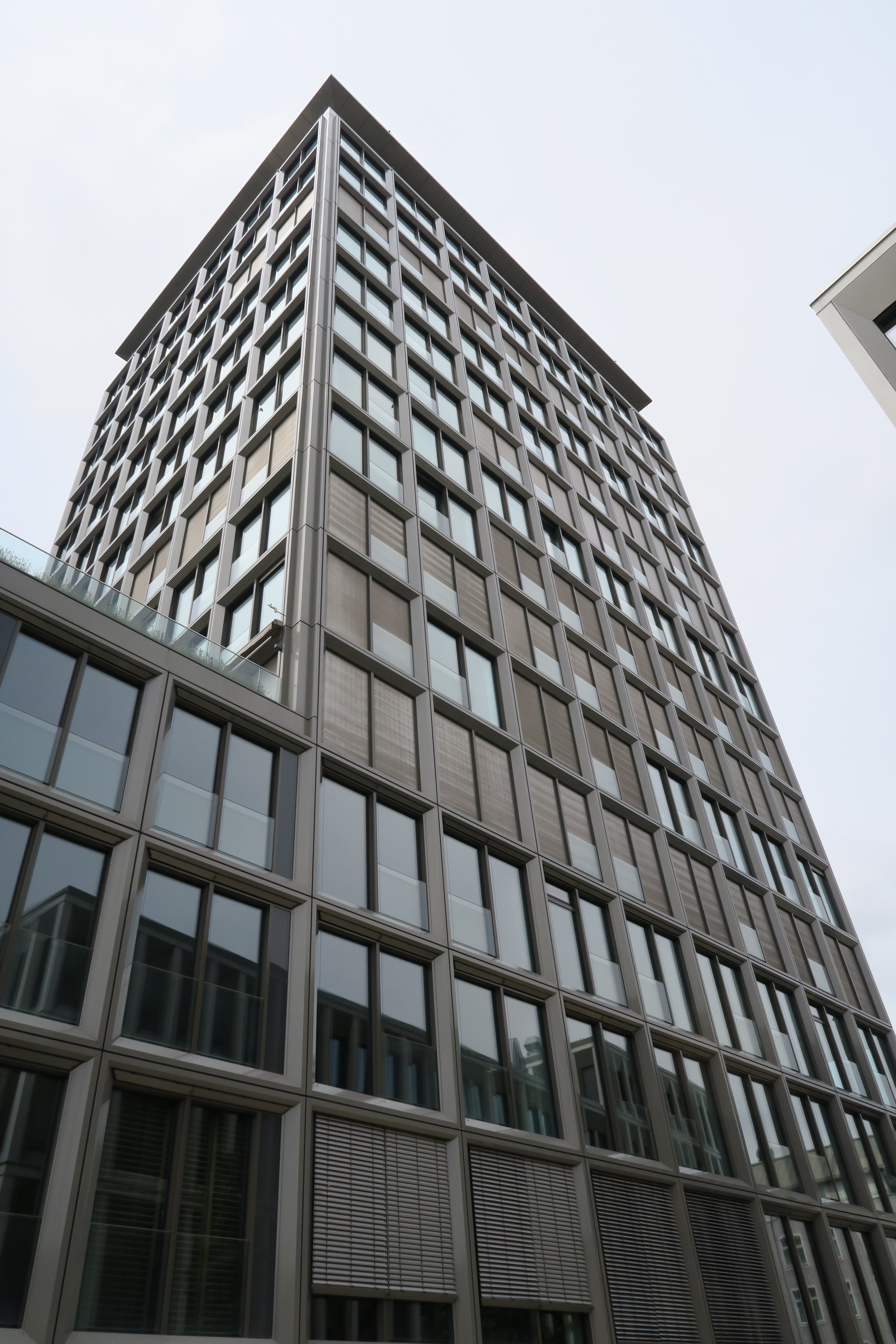
The seven
