= Poccistraße station =

Station of the Munich U-Bahn

Poccistraße
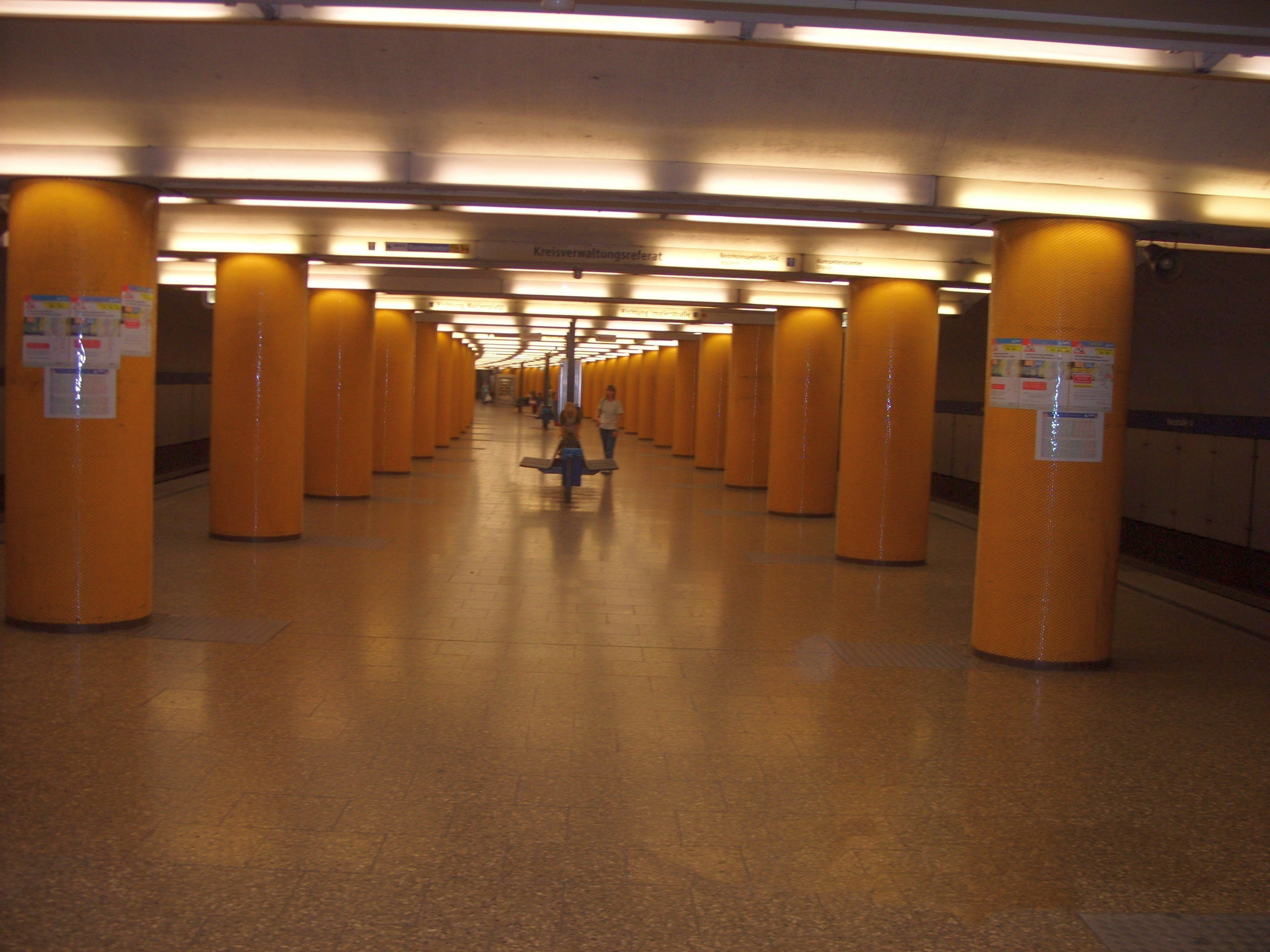

General information
- Location: Ludwigsvorstadt-Isarvorstadt; Munich, Germany
- Coordinates: 48°07′32″N 11°33′01″E
- Owner: Münchner Verkehrsgesellschaft
- Operator: Münchner Verkehrsgesellschaft
- Line: Stammstrecke 1
- Platforms: Island platform
- Tracks: 2
- Connections: Bus

Construction
- Structure type: Underground
- Accessible: Yes

Other information
- Fare zone: : M

History
- Opened: 28 May 1978

Services
Preceding station	Munich U-Bahn	Following station
Implerstraße towards Fürstenried West	U3	Goetheplatz towards Moosach
Implerstraße towards Klinikum Großhadern	U6	Goetheplatz towards Garching-Forschungszentrum
Location

Poccistraße is an U-Bahn station in Munich on the U3 and U6. It was named after Count Franz Pocci.

== History ==
The station was opened on May 28, 1978, three years after the rest of the line. It wasn't built with the rest of the line, as a city highway was planned for the space where the surface entrances would have been. After the scrapping of the highway plans, it was built along the operational line with the trains going slower through the construction zone.

The station had been in the original plans marked as possible later construction. The original project name was "Zenettistrasse". Before construction it was moved southward to provide connection to a planned S-Bahn station "München Süd", which was never realized.

From its opening in 1978 to 1985 the station had a connection to the train station München Süd.

== Static issues ==
During construction the certification for the used prestressing steel was revoked. In 1977 cracks in the ceiling were found. In 1978 some of the prestressing steel was found to be broken. In 2015 and 2016 the ceiling was found to have dropped in places up to 39 Millimeters (1.5 Inches). Additional support columns were added in December 2016.

== Future ==
Currently there is a discussion in the plans for the newly planned U9 to merge the stations Implerstraße and Poccistraße. The new station would have connection to the planned rail station Poccistraße. If these plans are implemented, both old stations would be closed to the public.
