= Sendling's night of murder =

1705 massacre in Sendling, Germany

- Sendlinger Mordweihnacht; Part of Bavarian uprising
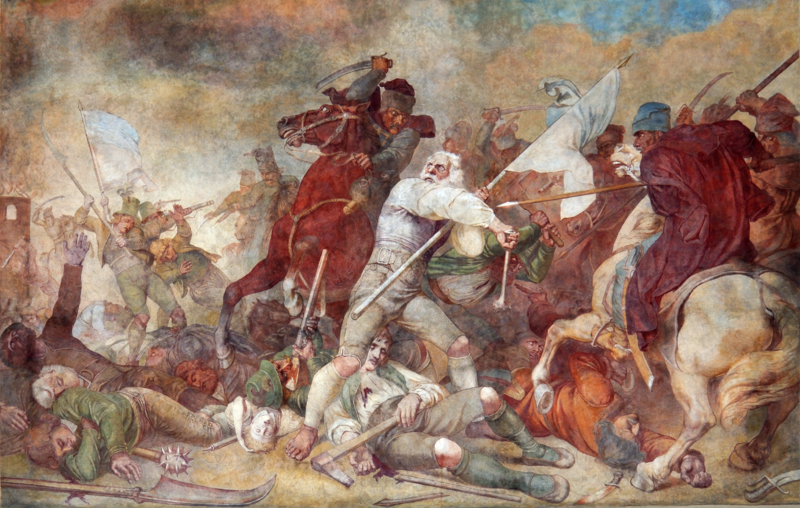
- Depiction of Sendling's night of murder from a fresco by Wilhelm Lindenschmit
- Date: 25 December 1705
- Location: Sendling, Electorate of Bavaria
- Caused by: Occupation of Munich in contravention of the Treaty of Ilbesheim

Parties
Bavarian peasantry	Army of the Holy Roman Empire

Lead figures
	Joseph I

Casualties and losses
1,100	40

Sendling's Christmas (night) of murder (German: Sendlinger Mordweihnacht) was a massacre in 1705 in Sendling, then 2 km south west of Munich. An army of peasants, protesting the Austrian regime during the Bavarian People's Uprising, had marched on Munich, but was betrayed from within and massacred. Some 1,100 peasants were killed.

This event has been a well-known cultural motif in German culture.

== Sources ==
- Darwin Porter, Danforth Prince. Frommer's Munich & the Bavarian Alps Volume 349 of Frommer's Complete Frommer's Series. Frommer's, 2007. ISBN 0-470-10090-7, ISBN 978-0-470-10090-5
