= Petuelring =

Road in Munich, Germany

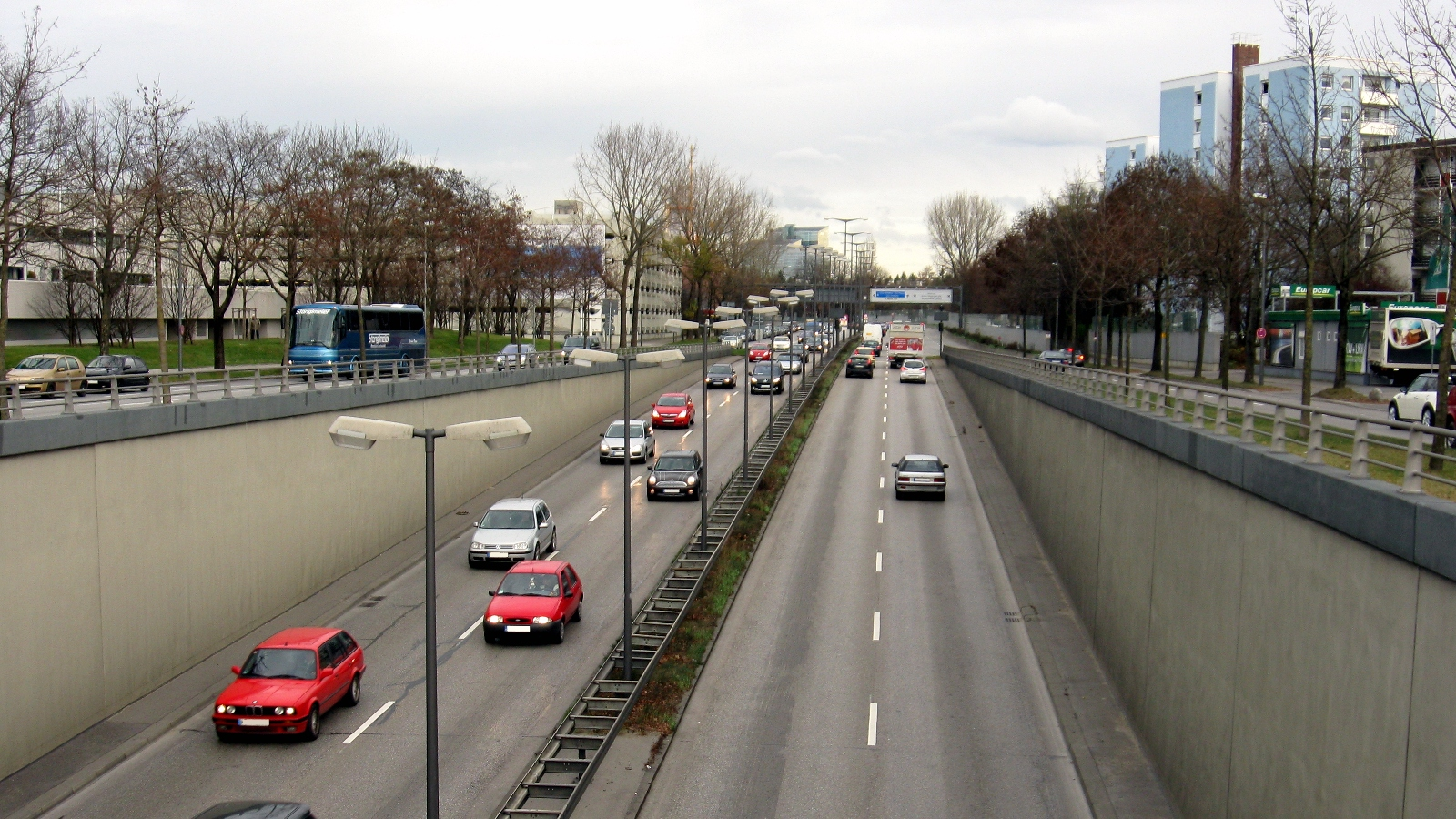
Petuelring at the Lerchenauer Straße

The Petuelring is an approximately 2.2 km long road in the north of Munich and part of the Mittlerer Ring. It runs between Georg-Brauchle-Ring and Schenkendorfstraße.

== Location ==
The Petuelring is located about four kilometers north of Munich city center. The ring runs in a west–east direction and marks the border between the city districts of Milbertshofen and Schwabing-West. The eastern part of the ring runs through the Petueltunnel. The Petuelpark is partly located above this tunnel.

== Course ==
The Georg-Brauchle-Ring coming from the Olympiapark merges into the Petuelring at the tunnelled crossing Lerchenauer Straße (München-Zentrum-Feldmoching-Hasenbergl). The BMW Museum is also located here. After 500 metres, the access ramps to the Petueltunnel, where the Petuelring runs, begin at Riesenfeldstraße. An air raid shelter from 1941 is located here.

On the surface, the two single-lane ramps lead to the Schleißheimer Straße intersection. From here the Petuelring runs along the Nymphenburg-Biedersteiner Canal in four lanes (without separation of the directional lanes) over the Petueltunnel towards the northeast. After 400 metres the Ring' reaches the intersection Knorrstraße/Belgradstraße. The road then flows into the Petueltunnel via connecting ramps. Continuing in an easterly direction, the Petuelring ends in Petueltunnel under the Leopoldstraße intersection and then becomes Schenkendorfstraße. From here the road (via the Isarring) has a connection to Bogenhausen, or (in the eastern direction via a side tunnel) to the A9 towards Nuremberg/Berlin.

Between Knorrstraße/Belgradstraße and Leopoldstraße the Petuelpark was built above the Petueltunnel. The Georgenschwaige outdoor swimming pool is also located there, and Luitpoldpark adjoins to the south.

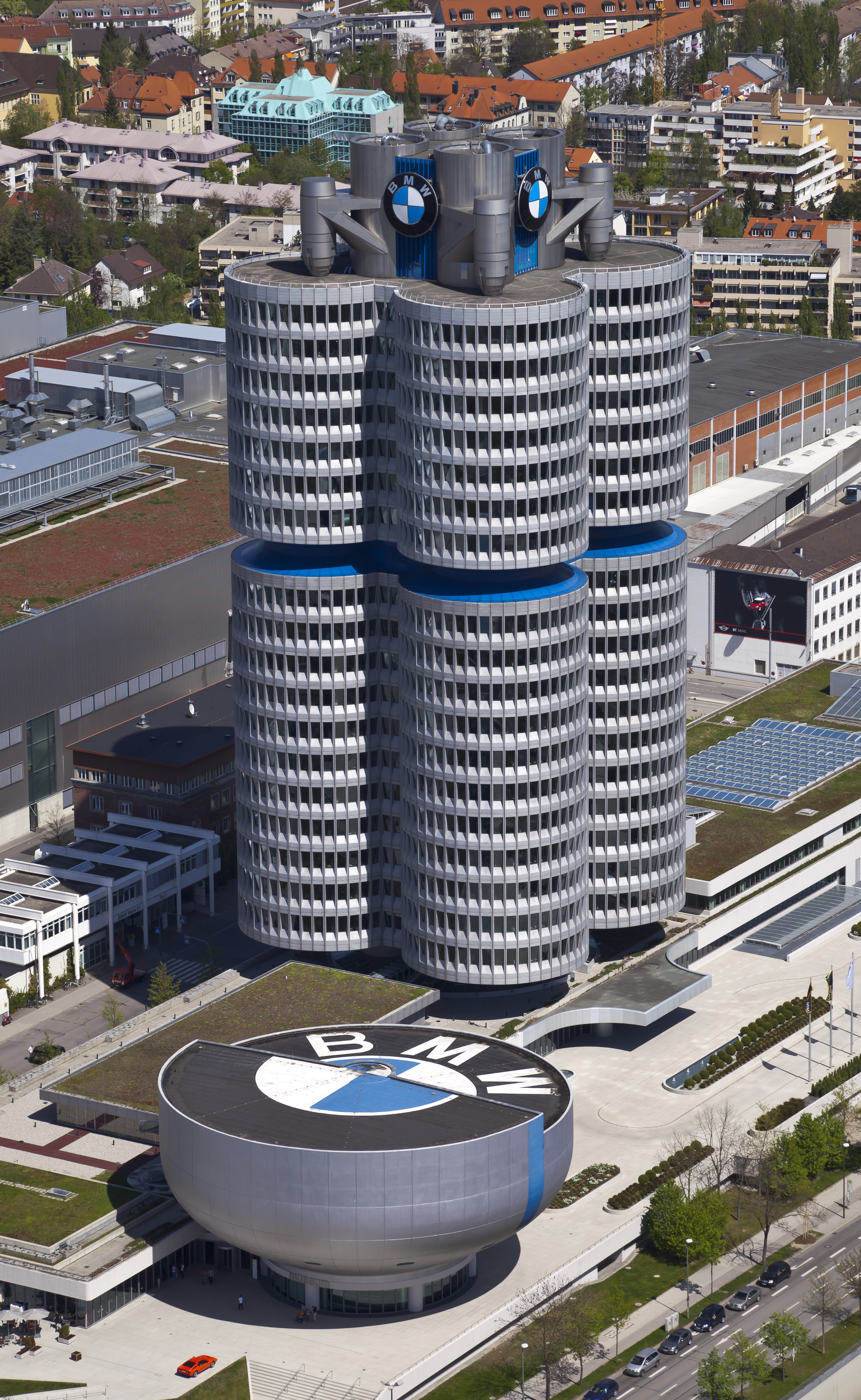
BMW-Museum

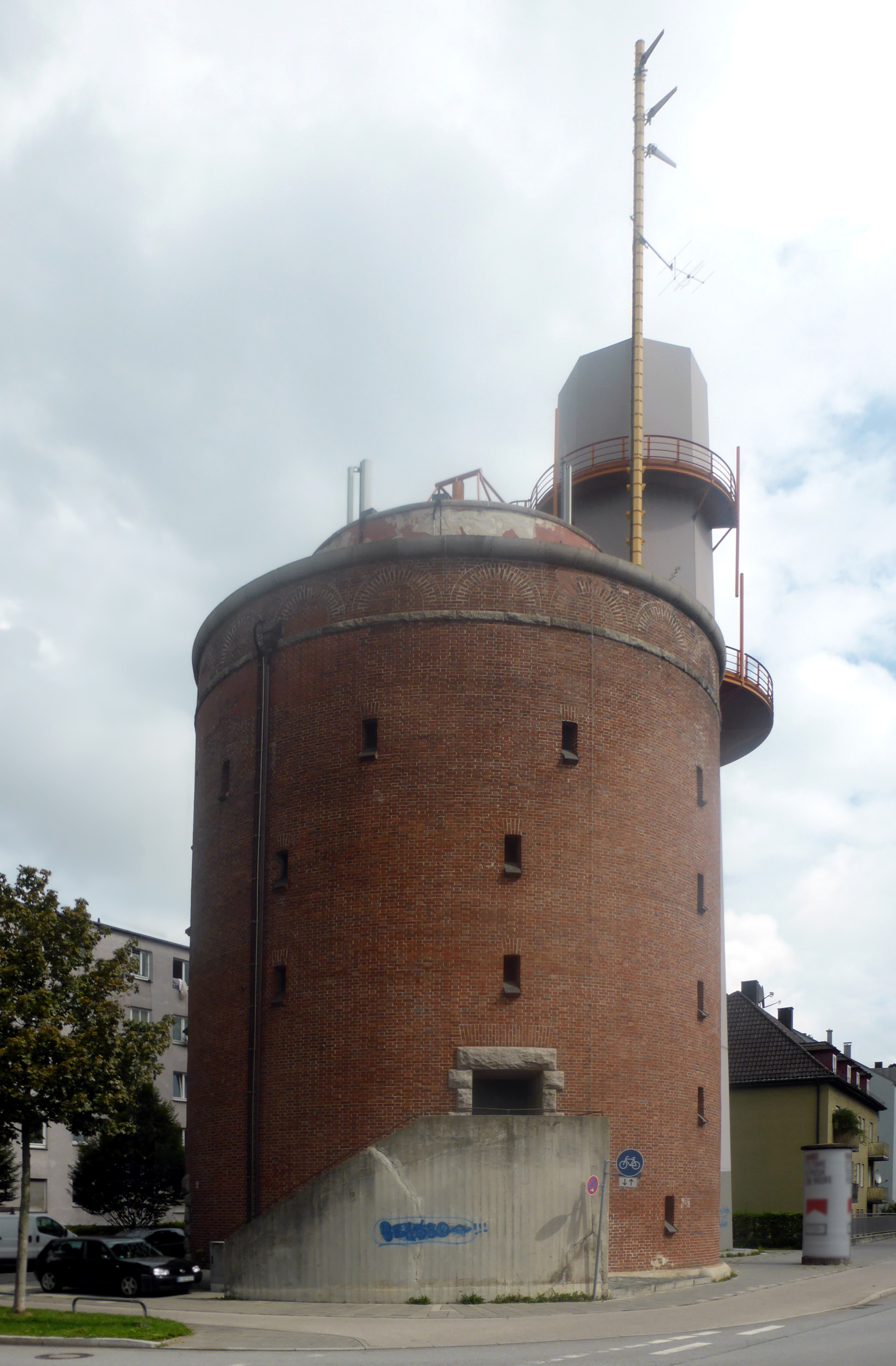
Riesenfeldstraße air raid shelter corner Petuelring

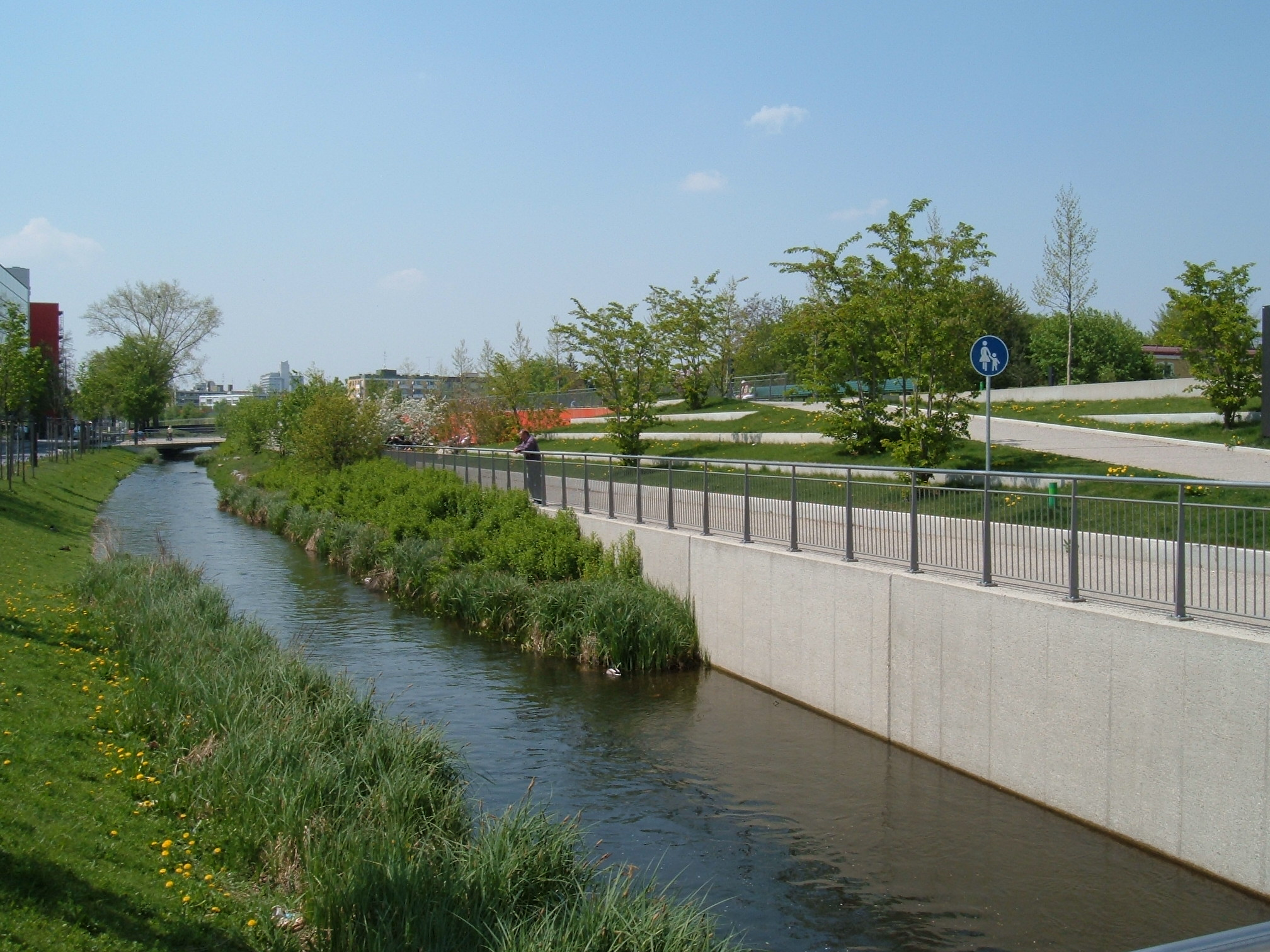
Nymphenburg-Biedersteiner Canal

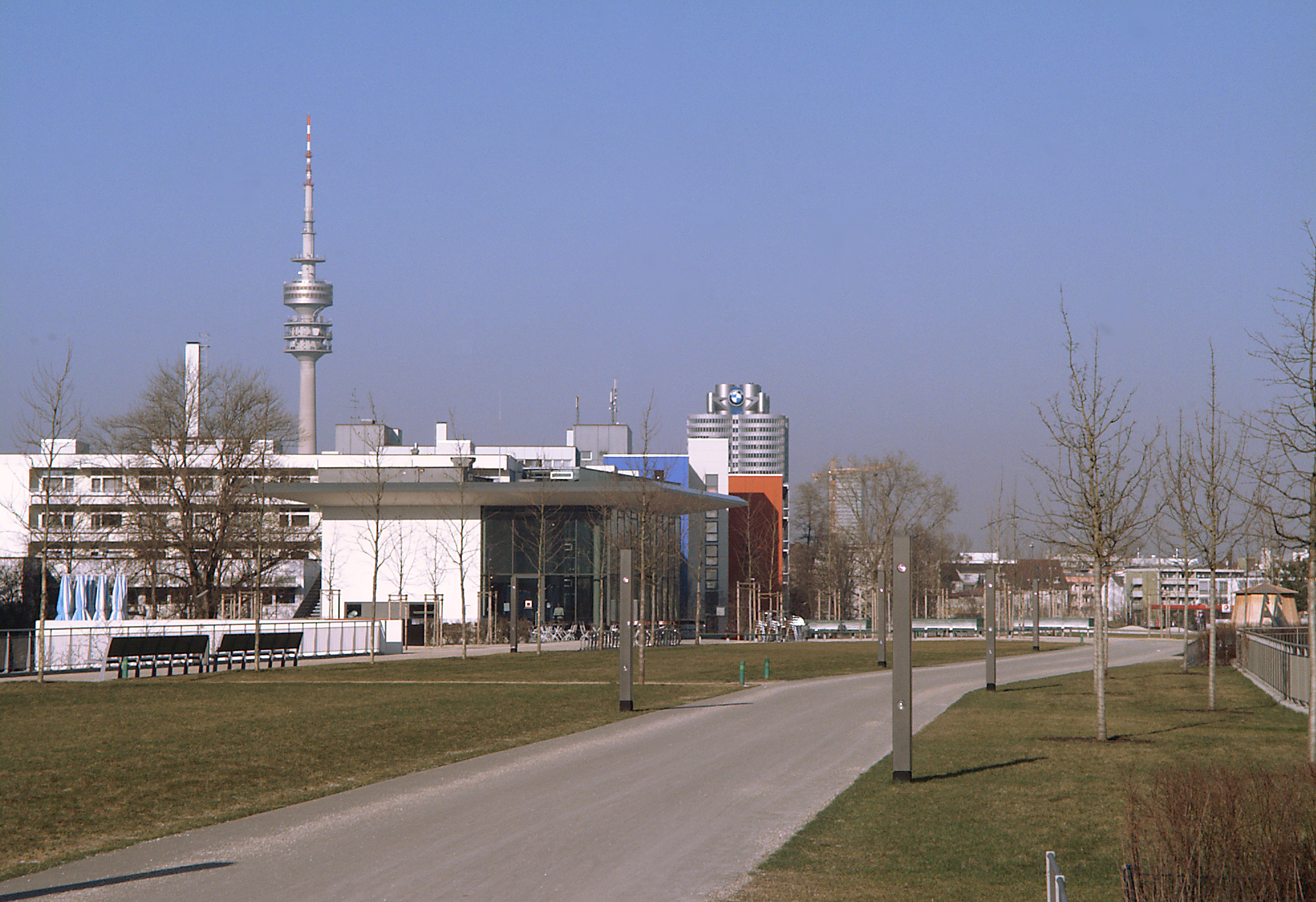
Petuelpark

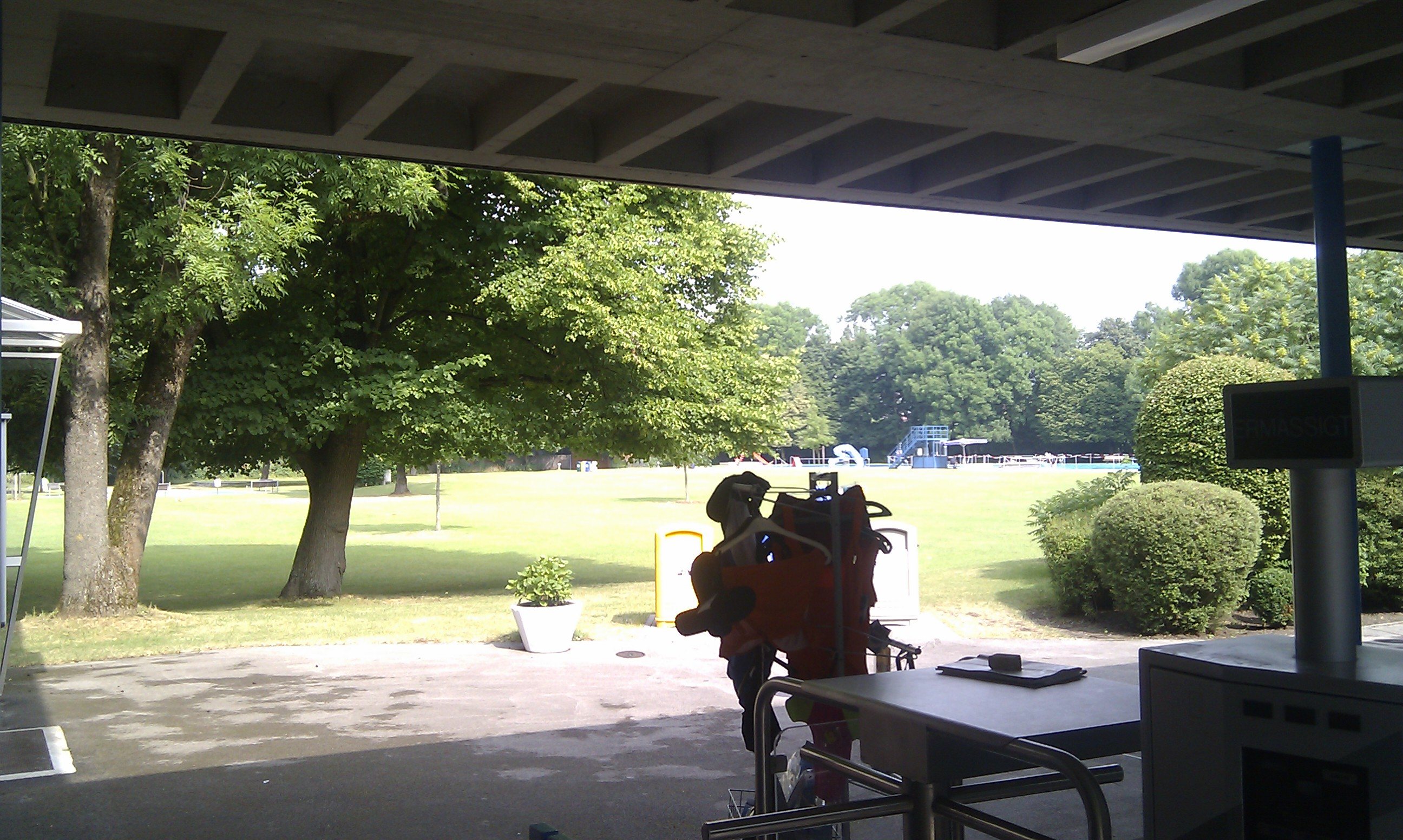
Bad Georgenschwaige

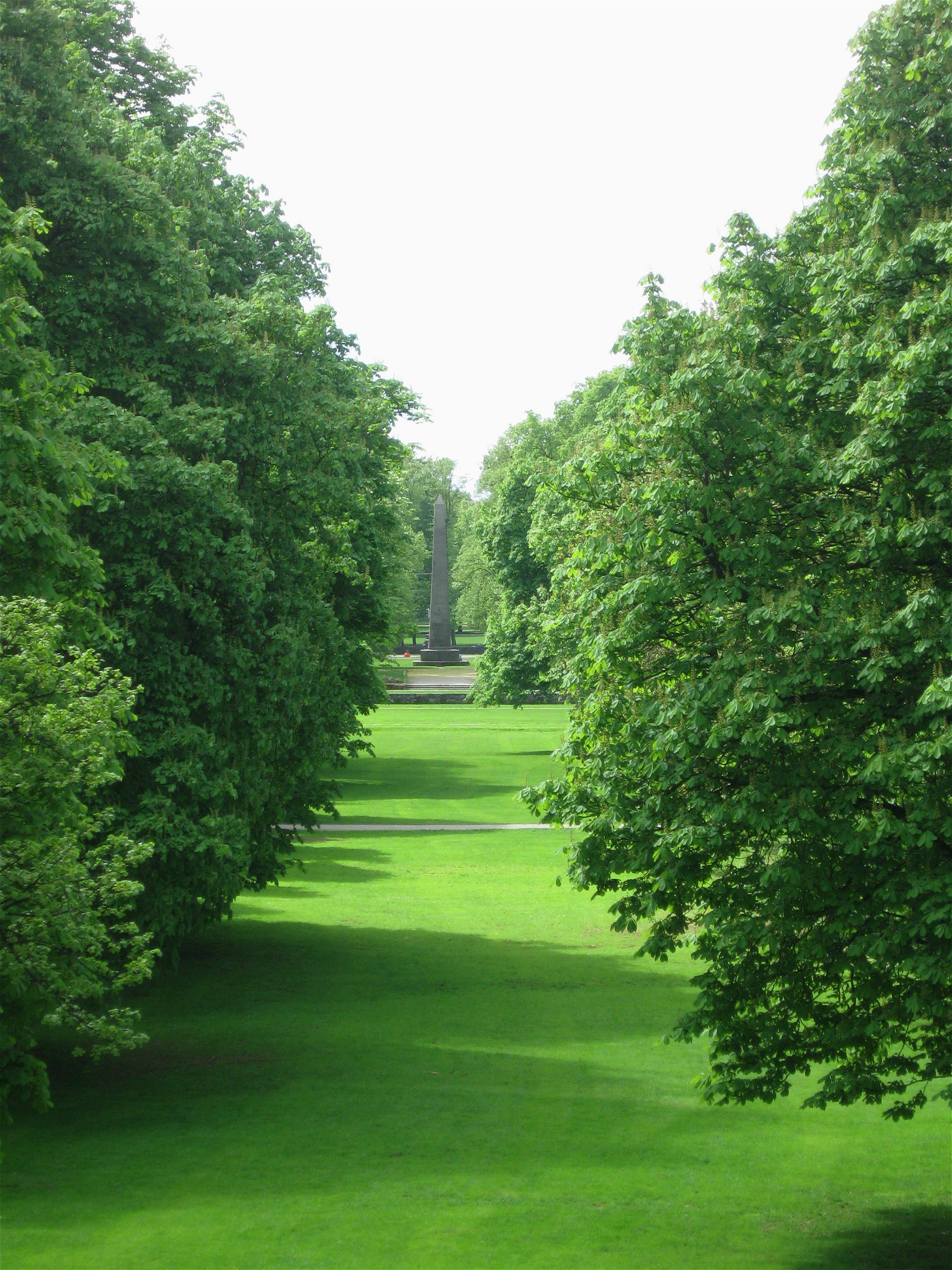
Luitpoldpark

== Intercourse ==
In the Munich transport network, the Petuelring is of great importance as part of the Mittlerer Ring. Up to 120,000 vehicles pass the ring every day. The ring has four lanes throughout. In the section of the Mittlerer Ring, the directional lanes are separated. At the surface above the Petueltunnel, the traffic load is 30,000 vehicles per day.

In the western area between Lerchenauer Straße and Schleißheimer Straße, the underground line U3 runs directly under the road. The underground station Petuelring is located south of the intersection Schleißheimer Straße.

== History ==
The Petuelring was just a better dirt road in the 19th century. Only through the fortification of Ludwig II did it become a real road. It is named after Ludwig Petuel sen. and Ludwig Petuel jun. The father moved to Milbertshofen in 1868 and earned a fortune here, of which he put large parts into the building fabric of Milbertshofen. His son also repeatedly made land available for urban development projects.

The Petuelring originated from the Petuelstraße. It started at the Triburger Platz. It followed the Nymphenburg-Biedersteiner Canal and changed into Schenkendorfstraße at the intersection of Belgradstraße.

The Petuelring was completed in 1961. A site from the Petuel Foundation was also included. Between the stops of the Rümann- and Keferloherstraße a tram underpass was built for the former line 8 and called Petueltunnel.

As the traffic load increased steadily, the planning of a tunnel was started in the 1980s. These were stopped after the local elections in 1990 by the participation of Die Grünen. After the citizens' decision in 1996 "Three tunnels are needed for the Ring", the citizens of Munich decided to build the Petueltunnel and against the red-green majority of the City Hall.

In 1993, the city shut down the first Petueltunnel served by tram lines 12 and 13.

== Petueltunnel ==
The construction of the new Petueltunnel began in 1997, which led to disruptions through the building site. The opening ceremony took place on 6 June 2002. Both the Petueltunnel and the road above it in the Schleißheimer Straße to Leopoldstraße area continue to bear the name Petuelring.

== Petuelpark ==
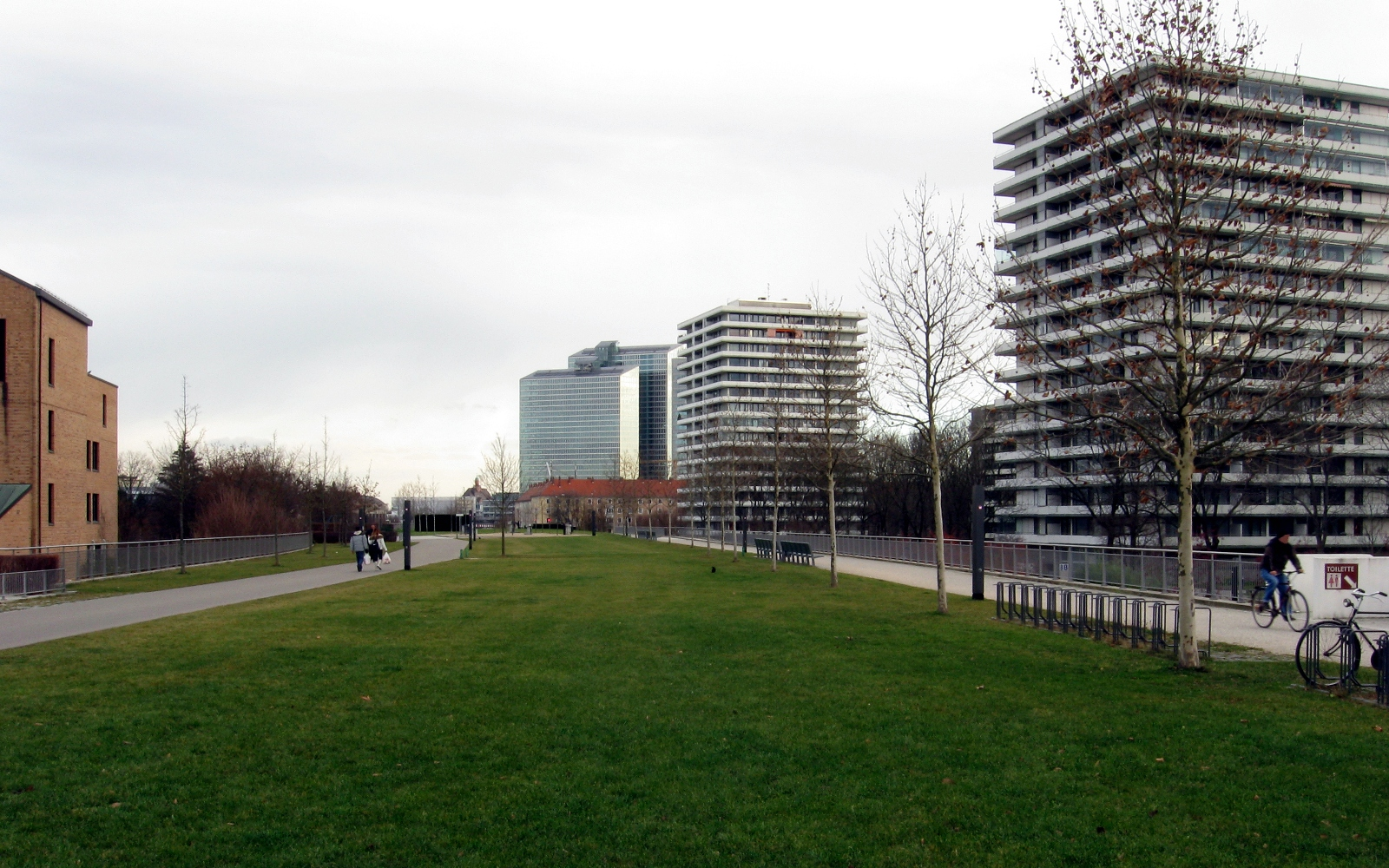
Petuelpark

After completion of construction work of the tunnel, the 7.4-hectare Petuelpark was built between 2002 and 2004 between Knorrstraße/Belgradstraße and Leopoldstraße. The raised part is dominated by extensive grass areas, on the lower level so-called Themengärten have been set up.

== Eponym ==
The street is named after several members of the Petuel family. Ludwig Petuel Sr. was a brewer from Freising and had a canal road extended, on the route of which the Petuelring now runs. His son Ludwig jun. and his wife Karolina bequeathed their entire fortune to the city of Munich in the 1930s as they had no children. Since the 1950s it has been administered by the Ludwig and Lina Petuel Foundation.
