= Ungererstraße =

Street in Munich, Germany

Coordinates: 48.177508°N 11.60166°E

The Ungererstraße is a street about 2.5 km long in the Schwabing district of Munich.

It leads (parallel to the English Garden) from Leopoldstraße at the Münchner Freiheit in the north-east direction past the Ungererbad and the Nordfriedhof to Freimann past the Studentenstadt to Freisinger Landstraße at the corner of the Frankfurter Ring. In the northern part, west of the road, lies Neuer Israelitische Friedhof. The street's subway stations are: Dietlindenstraße, Nordfriedhof, Alte Heide and Studentenstadt. The Ungererstraße was formerly called Landshuter Straße and Freisinger Landstraße, before it was renamed after August Ungerer (1860–1921), the engineer and owner of the Ungererbad.

In 1886, August Ungerer opened the Ungerer Tramway in the Freisinger Landstraße, which was the first electric tram in Munich to link Schwabing's Würmbad (today Ungererbad) to the horse-drawn railway network at the Schwabinger Großwirt. In 1895, the Ungererbahn was replaced by a new horse-drawn carriage track, which continued on the Freisinger Landstraße to the Nordfriedhof. In 1900, the tram line in the Ungererstraße was the last Munich horse-drawn railway line to be converted to electric operation. In 1917, the tram was extended from the Nordfriedhof on the Ungererstraße to the Frankfurter Ring. In the course of the construction of the subway, the since 1935 driven "Straßenbahnlinie 6" route was moved between the Münchner Freiheit and Schenkendorfstraße to the parallel Leopoldstraße and Berliner Straße in 1965, at the same time, the section from the Nordfriedhof to the Freimanner platz was stopped. In 1967 the section from Schenkendorfstraße to the Wendeschleife at the Nordfriedhof was the last tram line on the Ungererstraße to be closed down. Since 1970, the subway line 6 runs to the subway station Alte Heide under the Ungererstraße and in the north section parallel to the Ungererstraße.

From 1901 to 1949, the railway connection of the locomotive factory J. A. Maffei in the Hirschau at the Munich-Schwabing station, crossed the Ungererstraße south of Schenkendorfstraße with a railway crossing. Through this, a rail crossing was created with the tram rails.

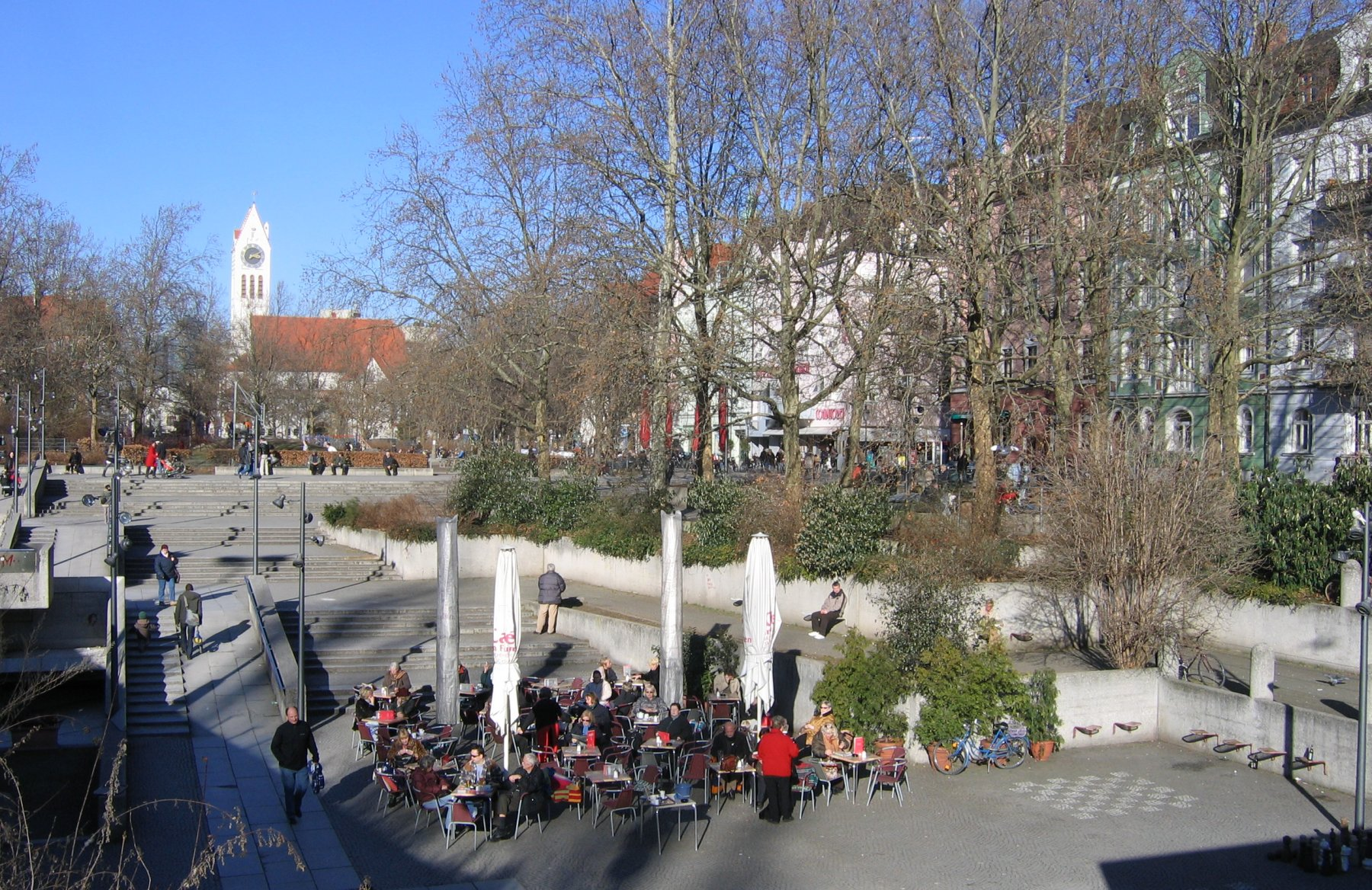
Münchner Freiheit

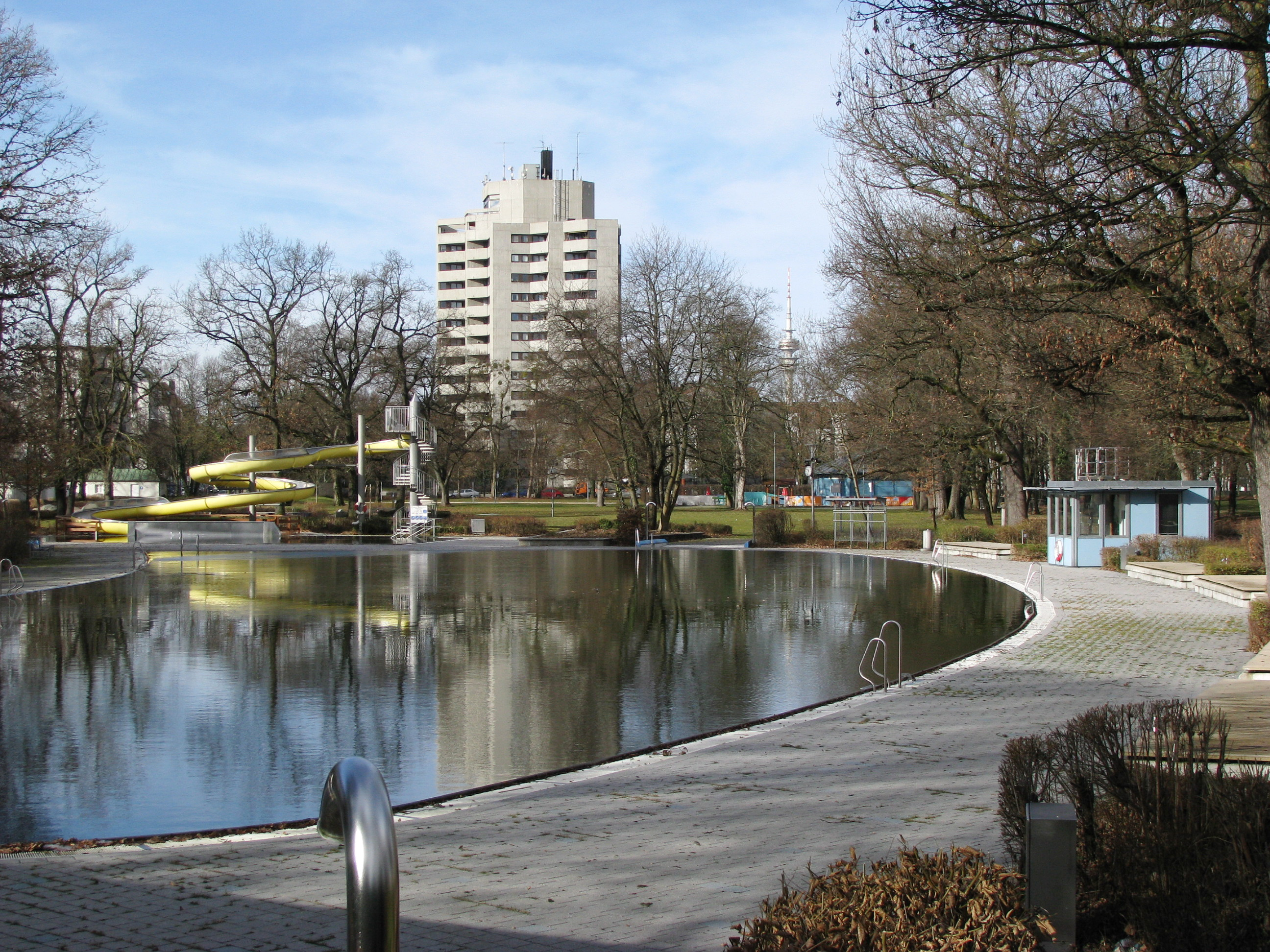
Ungererbad

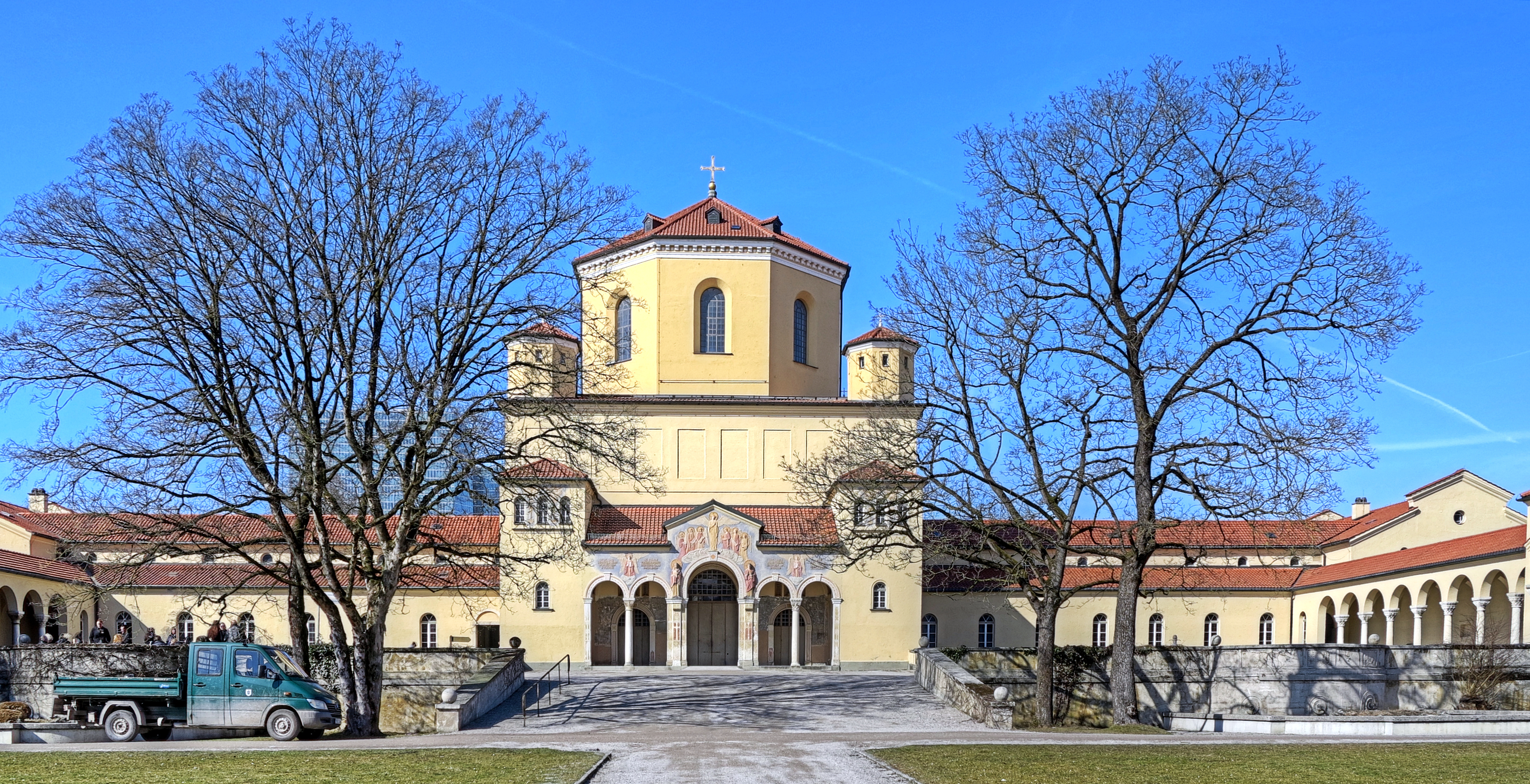
Nordfriedhof

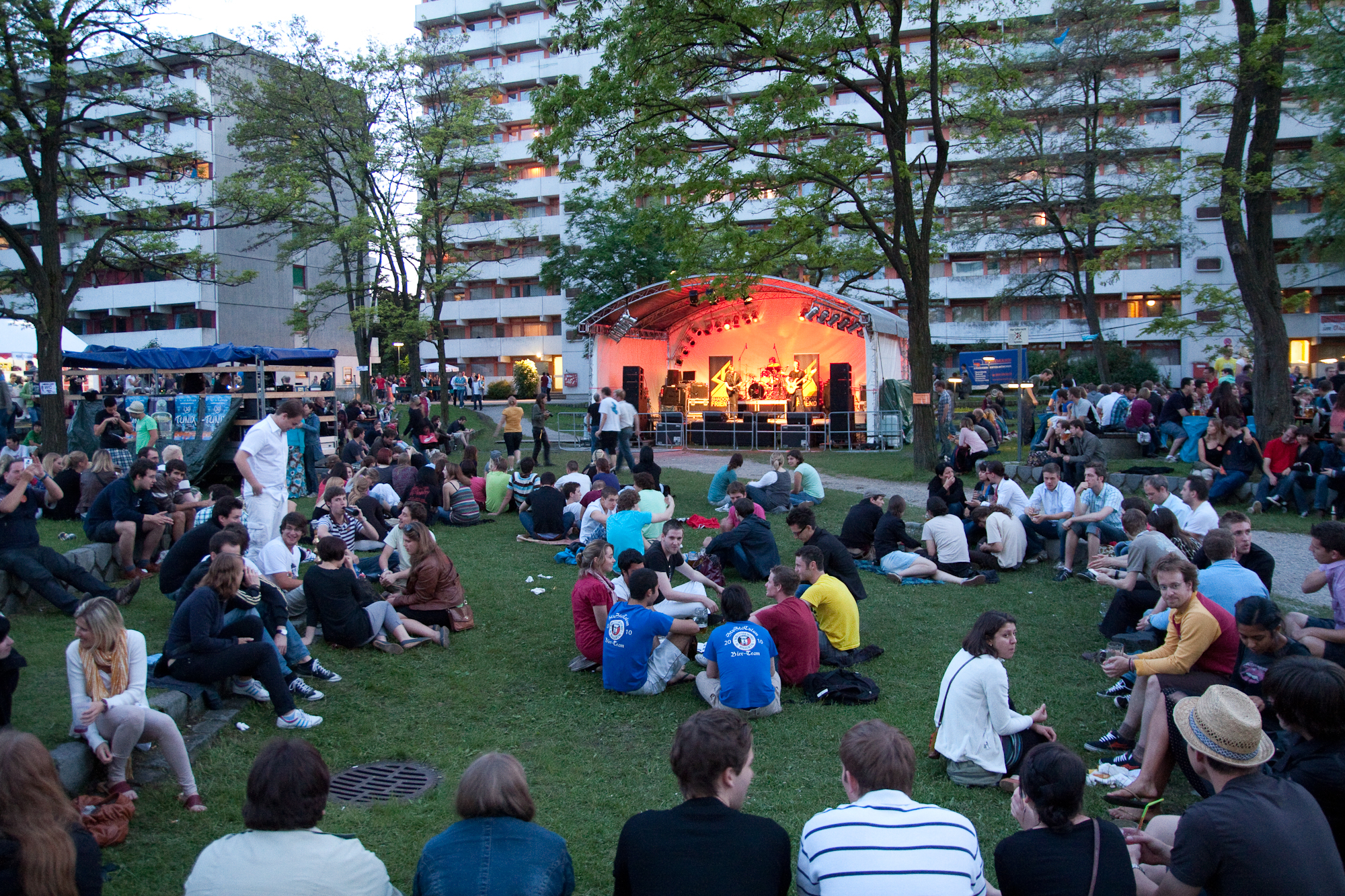
Studentenstadt

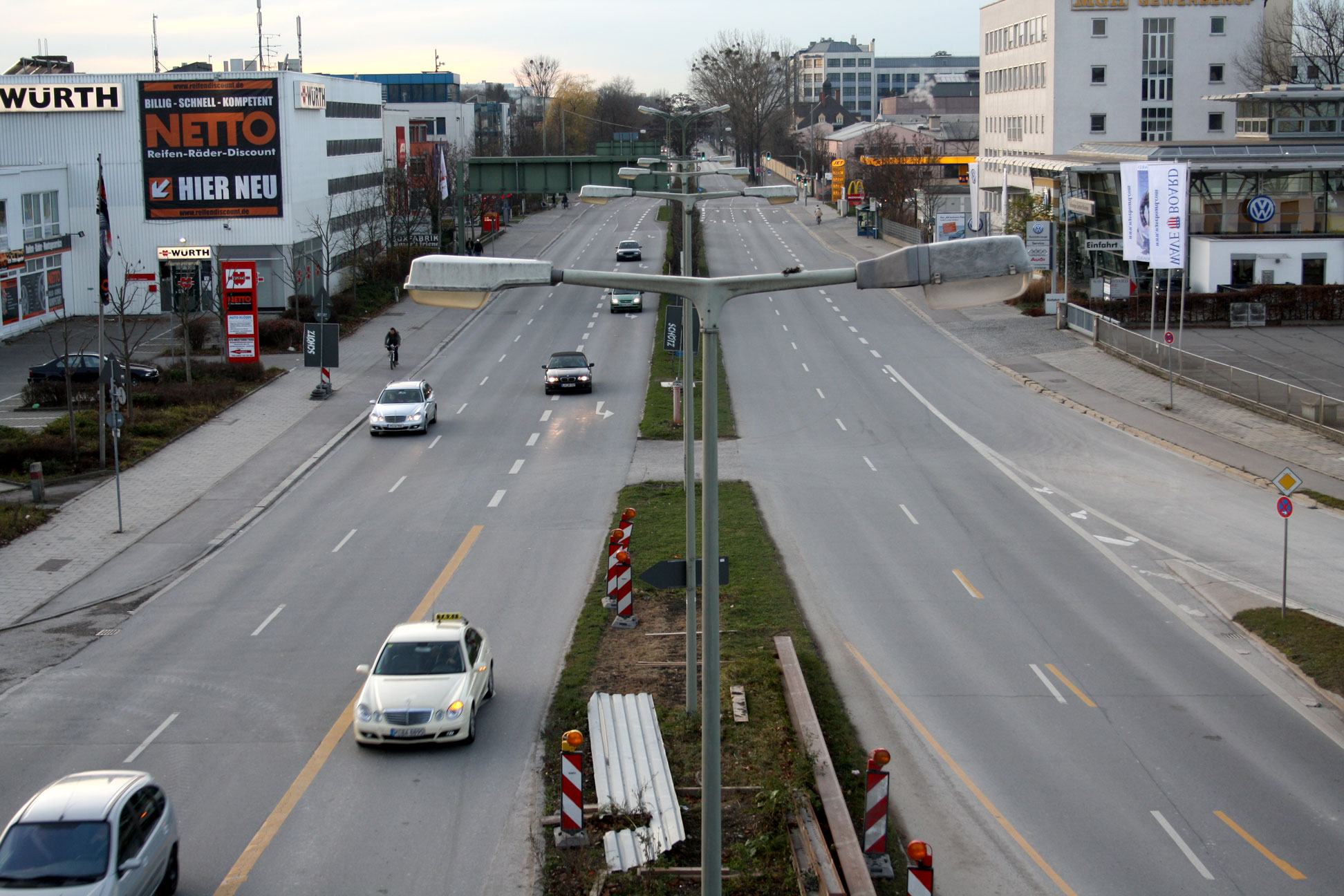
Frankfurter Ring
