= Schenkendorfstraße =

Street in Munich, Germany

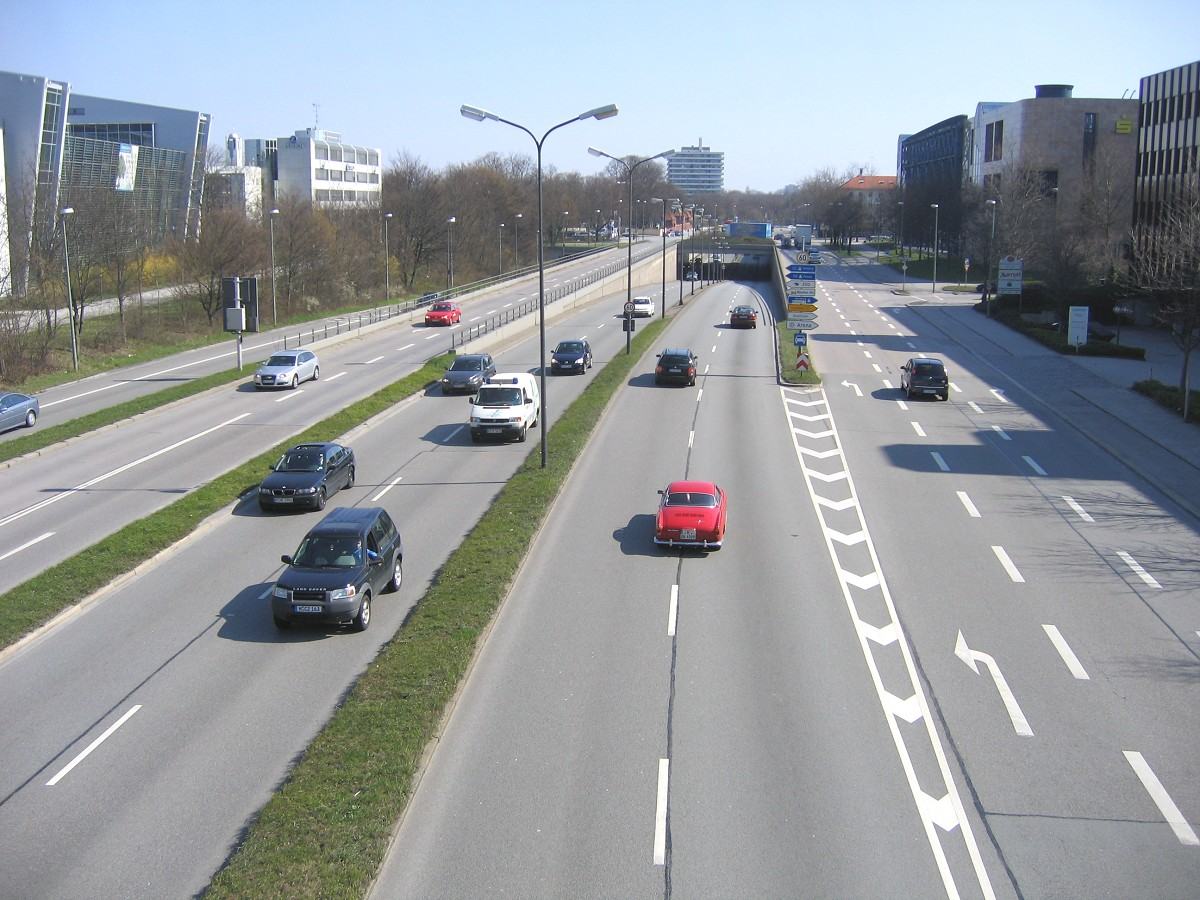
- Schenkendorfstraße at the exit to Ungererstraße

- Location within Germany
- Part of: Bundesstraße 2 R
- Namesake: Max von Schenkendorf
- Length: 1,000 m (3,300 ft)
- Location: Munich
- Arrondissement: Schwabing-Freimann
- Quarter: Schwabing
- Nearest metro station: Nordfriedhof
- Coordinates: 48.176169°N 11.5914°E
- West end: Petuelring
- Major junctions: Leopoldstraße, Bundesautobahn 9, Ungererstraße
- East end: Isarring

The Schenkendorfstraße is a four- to ten-lane section of the Mittlerer Ring in Munich.

== Location ==
The Schenkendorfstraße is located about four kilometers north of the Munich city center in the district Schwabing-Freimann. It runs in a west–east direction from Leopoldstraße to Ungererstraße.

== Route ==
Coming over the Petuelring from Moosach and Olympiapark, Schenkendorfstraße joins the Petuel Tunnel and the intersection with Leopoldstraße. The southern directional lane is guided in a glass enclosure.

Then, the junction München-Schwabing of the A 9 (Munich – Berlin) follows. After the on and off ramps to Ungererstraße, the Schenkendorfstraße goes into the Isarring.

== Traffic ==
=== General ===
The traffic load of the Schenkendorfstraße is 78,000 to 84,000 vehicles per day. Noise pollution at night is 65 db(A).

=== Public Transportation ===
Schenkendorfstraße is not directly connected to means for public transport. Under the intersection with the Ungererstraße (B 11) is the two-track underground station Nordfriedhof the line U6. Originally, the subway station was to bear the name Schenkendorfstraße.

=== Pedestrian Bridge ===
To connect the area around Berliner Straße, south of the Schenkendorfstraße, with the district of Alte Heide in the north, the pedestrian bridge over the Schenkendorfstraße was built in 1985, a suspension bridge with A-shaped pylons and only one support cable. Cable suspended bridge and glass enclosure

=== Cable suspended bridge ===
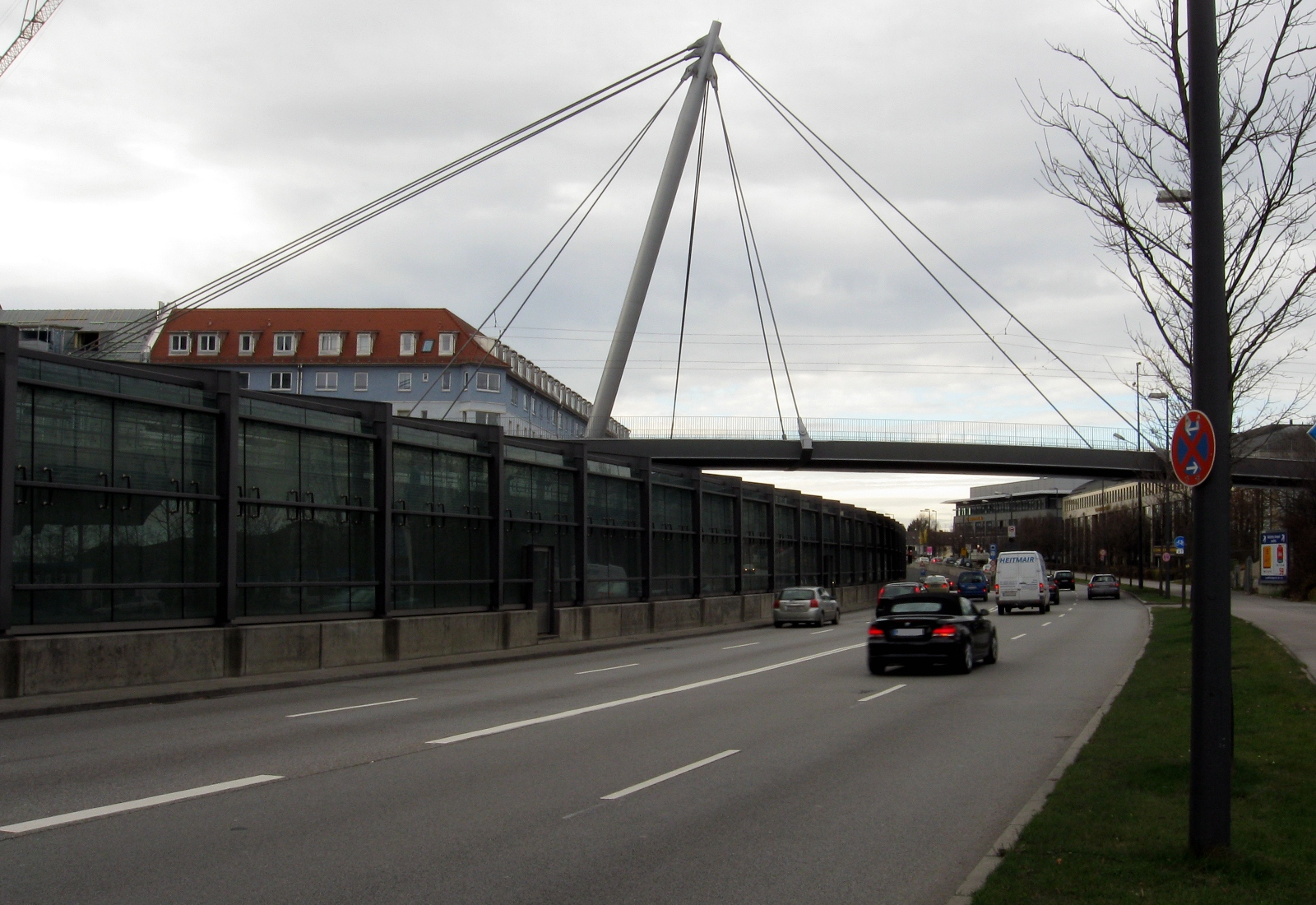
Cable suspended bridge

After a decision of the city council in 1997, the construction of the tram line 23 from the Münchner Freiheit in the park city Schwabing began on 20 March 2007, and was opened on 12 December 2009.

The tram crosses the Schenkendorfstraße on the Schenkendorf bridge, an 84-meter long cable suspended bridge with a pylon, which also allows pedestrians and cyclists to cross the road. First, the foundations and the mast were created. On 5 July 2008, and on 6 July 2008, the pre-fabricated bridge elements were put into place. The construction costs of the bridge amounted to € 7.2 million.

At the site of the Schenkendorf bridge, until 1990, there was a railway bridge on which the railway line from the Munich North Ring to the freight station Schwabing Schenkendorfstraße crossed.

== Buildings and surroundings ==
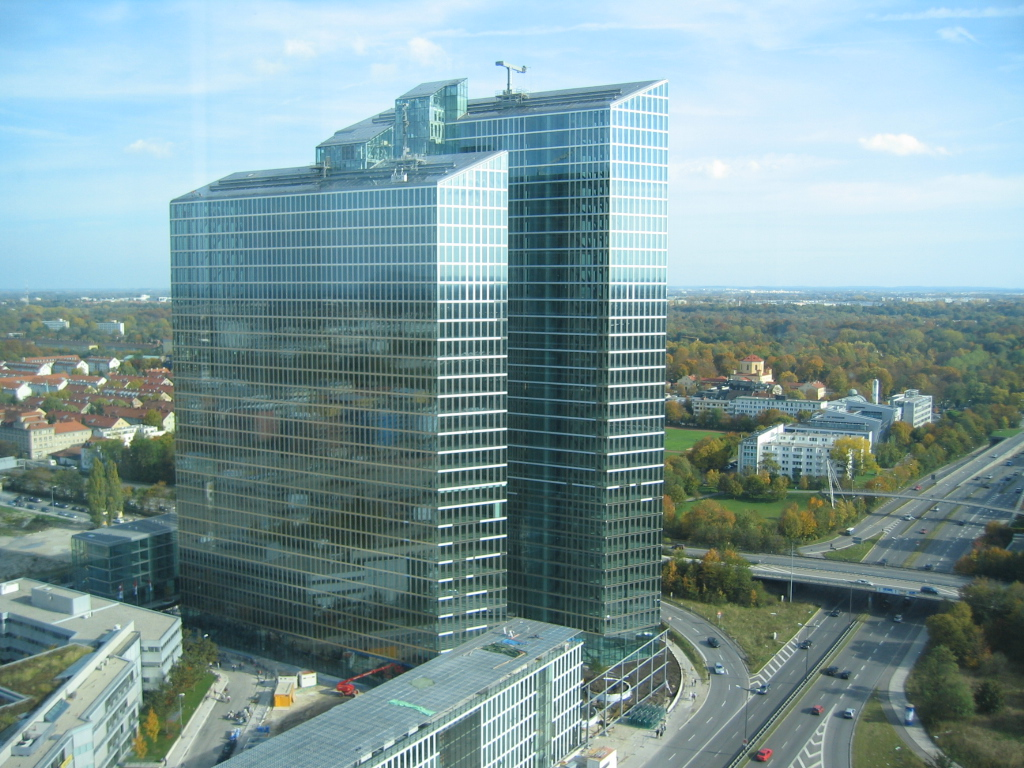
Highlight Towers with the confluence of the A 9

The surroundings north and south of Schenkendorfstraße has developed differently over time. Schenkendorfstraße is home to only about 900 residents.

South of the Schenkendorfstraße are densely populated residential areas (Nordschwabing). In the north, predominantly industrial areas dominate the picture. There are isolated residential buildings on the Schenkendorfstraße. Via the Lyonel-Feininger-Straße, the residential area Parkstadt Schwabing in the north is connected to the Schenkendorfstraße (only northern directional traffic route).

Directly at the Autobahn junction, south of the Schenkendorfstraße, is the high-rise ensemble Münchner Tor. Directly opposite are the Highlight Towers.

== History ==
The Schenkendorfstraße was originally a side street and led from the Belgradstraße over the Leopoldstraße and the Scheidplatz to Ungererstraße. It had a length of about two kilometers. Between 1958 and 1960, the A 9 was extended from Heidemannstraße to Schenkendorfstraße. The road was therefore expanded to four-lanes. From there on, it led from Leopoldstraße to Ungererstraße and the upgrade to the main road took place.

From 1997 to 2002, the Petueltunnel was built. Since then, the main throughways of the Schenkendorfstraße start directly under the Leopoldstraße in the tunnel. In this context, the southern directional lane got a glass enclosure.
