= Isarring =

Street in Munich, Germany

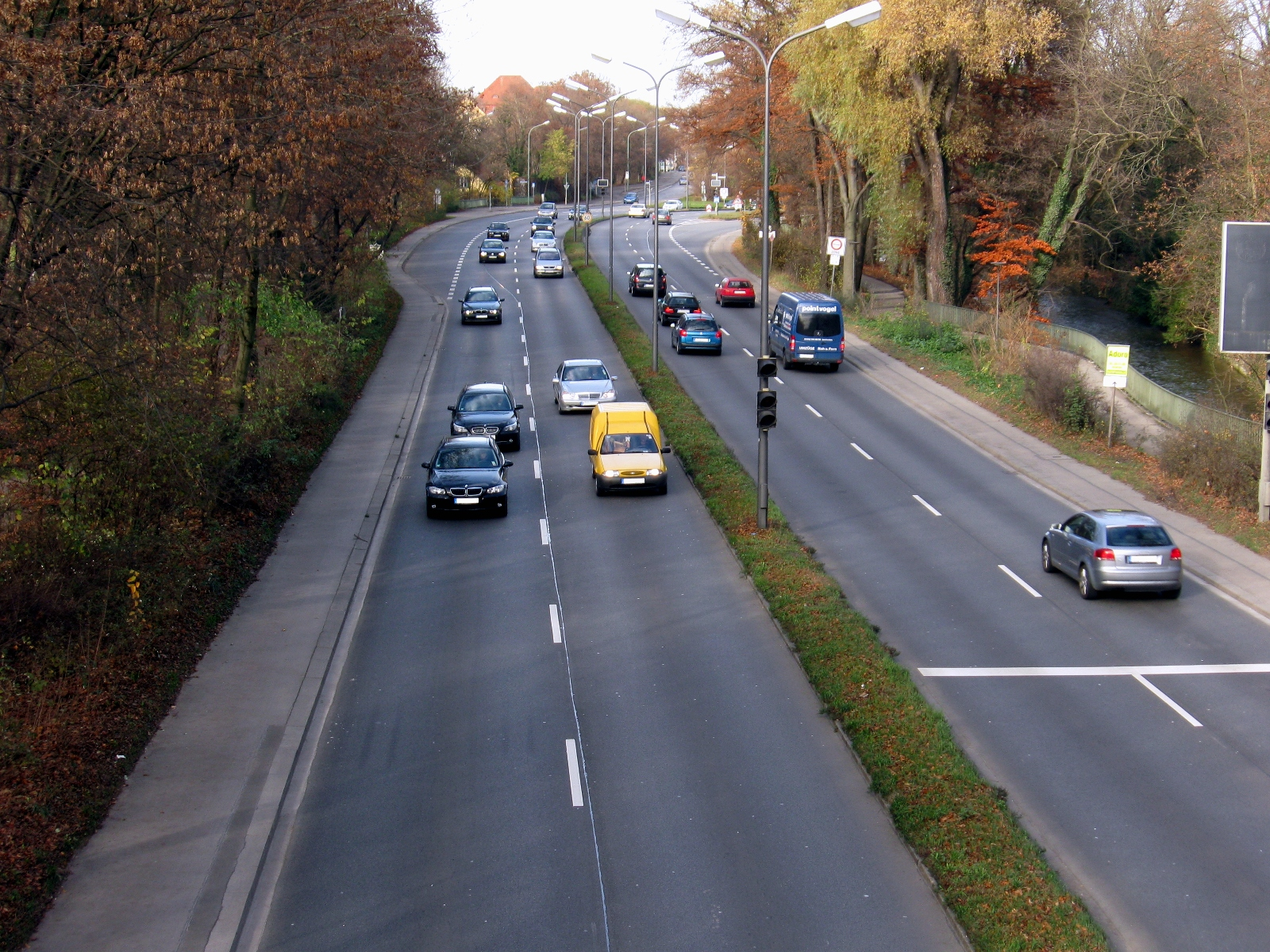
- Isarring in the English Garden

- Location within Germany
- Location: Munich
- Nearest metro station: Nordfriedhof (U6), Arabellapark (U4)
- Coordinates: 48.16018°N 11.60108°E
- Major junctions: Oberföhringer Straße, Kolbergstraße, Mauerkircherstraße, Pienzenauerstraße, Heinrich-Mann-Allee, Ifflandstraße, Kleinhesselohe, Dietlindenstraße, Mannlichstraße, Amsterdamer Straße, Genter Straße, Peter-Paul-Althaus-Straße, Niebuhrstraße, Brabanter Straße, Ungererstraße

The Isarring is a four-lane section of the Mittlerer Ring, the Bundesstraße 2 R (federal highway), in Munich. It is used by 110,000 cars every day and was constructed in 1966.

== Route ==
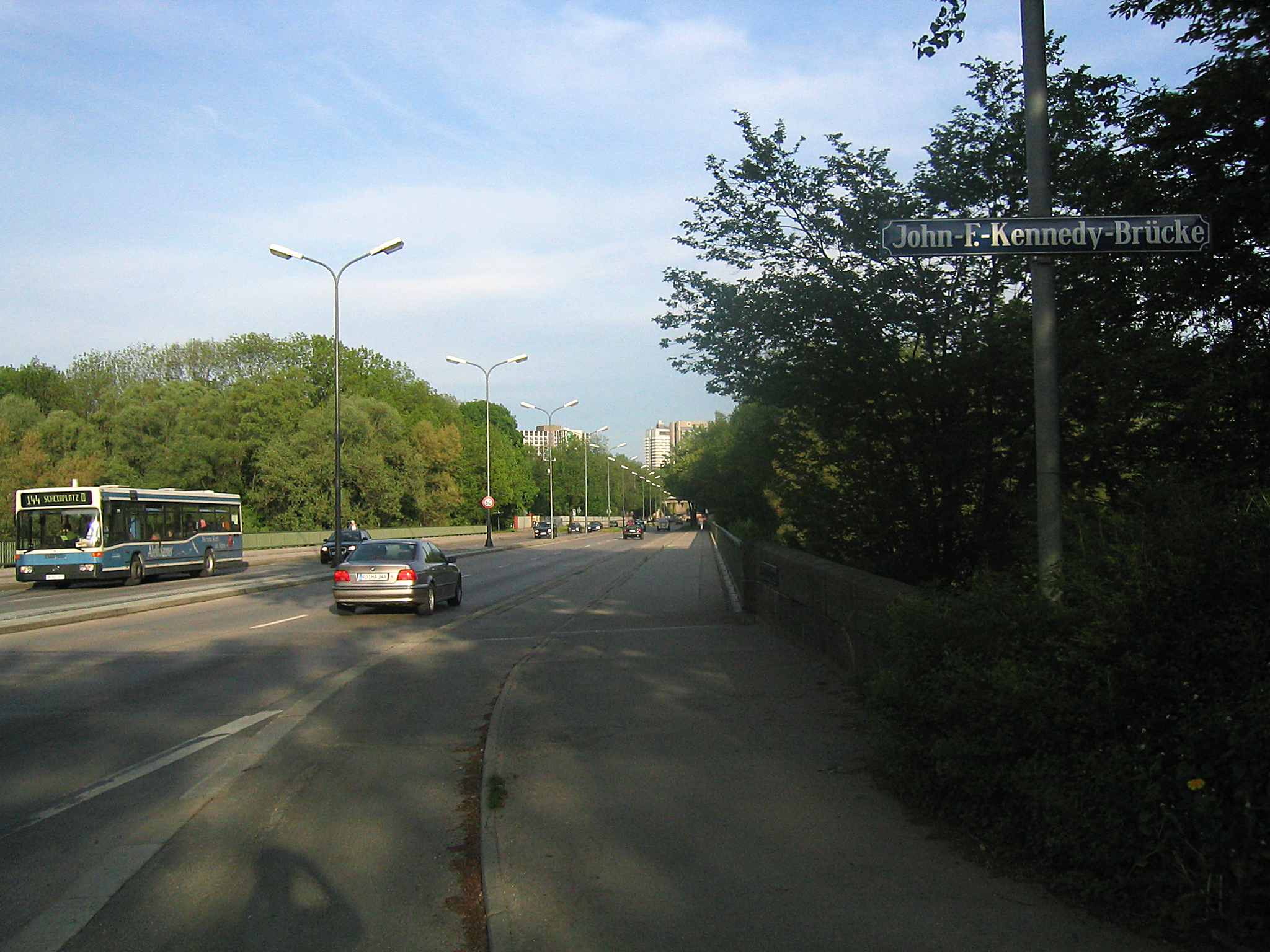
The John F. Kennedy Bridge, looking towards Effnerplatz

The Isarring joins at the Ungererstraße exit onto Schenkendorfstraße. From this intersection-free junction, the Ungererstraße turns into the Bundesstraße 11 as it leaves the city. On the side leaving the city is now, the Nordfriedhof; the ring is lowered at this point. After a right turn, the road leads into the Biederstein Tunnel, whose name derives from the Schlösschen Biederstein (Castle Biederstein), but which was demolished decades ago. In its place are a dormitory and a retirement home.

After the tunnel and a left turn, the ring leads through the Englischer Garten (English Garden). On the right is the Kleinhesseloher See (lake) with the restaurant Seehaus. It then follows the Tucherpark exit, where the road crosses the Isar on the John F. Kennedy bridge - hence the name Isarring - and runs to the Effnerplatz.

== Public transport ==
Immediately at the junction Ungererstraße is the U6 subway line station Nordfriedhof. Since the Schenkendorfstraße ends there, the station was originally supposed to be called Schenkendorfstraße. At the Nordfriedhof, there is a direct connection to the Munich Airport, with the airport bus.

== Initiative M-ein Englischer Garten ==
The Isarring cuts the Englischer Garten into a southern and a northern part. The Initiative M-ein Englischer Garten, would like to lay the Isarring, at 380 meters, into a tunnel in order to reunite the northern and southern portions of the Englischer Garten. This is to restore the historical shape of the Englischer Garten, as it was before the construction of the Isarings. The Englischer Garten would then again be a continuous city park with north–south extension of 5 km length. On 28 June 2017, the Munich City Council unanimously approved the project.
