= Dietlindenstraße station =

Station of the Munich U-Bahn

Dietlindenstraße
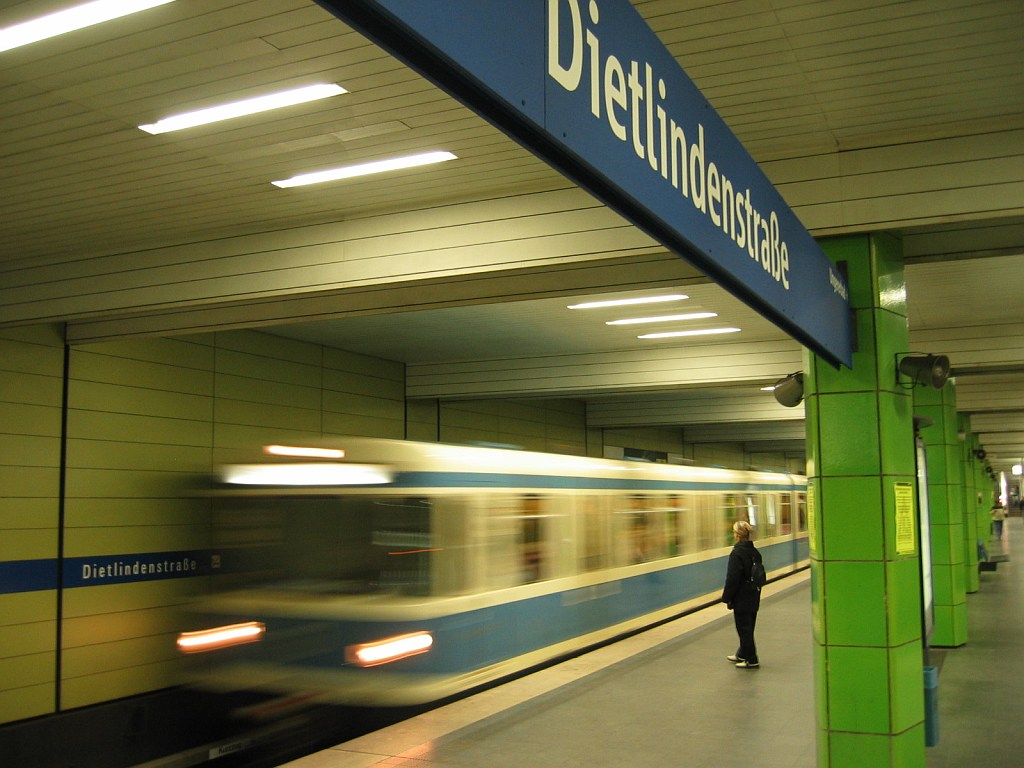

General information
- Location: Schwabing-Freimann; Munich, Germany
- Coordinates: 48°10′02″N 11°35′28″E
- Platforms: Island platform
- Tracks: 2
- Connections: MVV buses

Construction
- Structure type: Underground
- Accessible: Yes

Other information
- Fare zone: : M

Services
Preceding station	Munich U-Bahn	Following station
Münchner Freiheit towards Klinikum Großhadern	U6	Nordfriedhof towards Garching-Forschungszentrum
Location

Dietlindenstraße is an U-Bahn station in Munich on the U6 line of the Munich U-Bahn system. The station opened on 19 October 1971.

== See also ==
- List of Munich U-Bahn stations
