= Alte Heide station =

Station of the Munich U-Bahn

Alte Heide
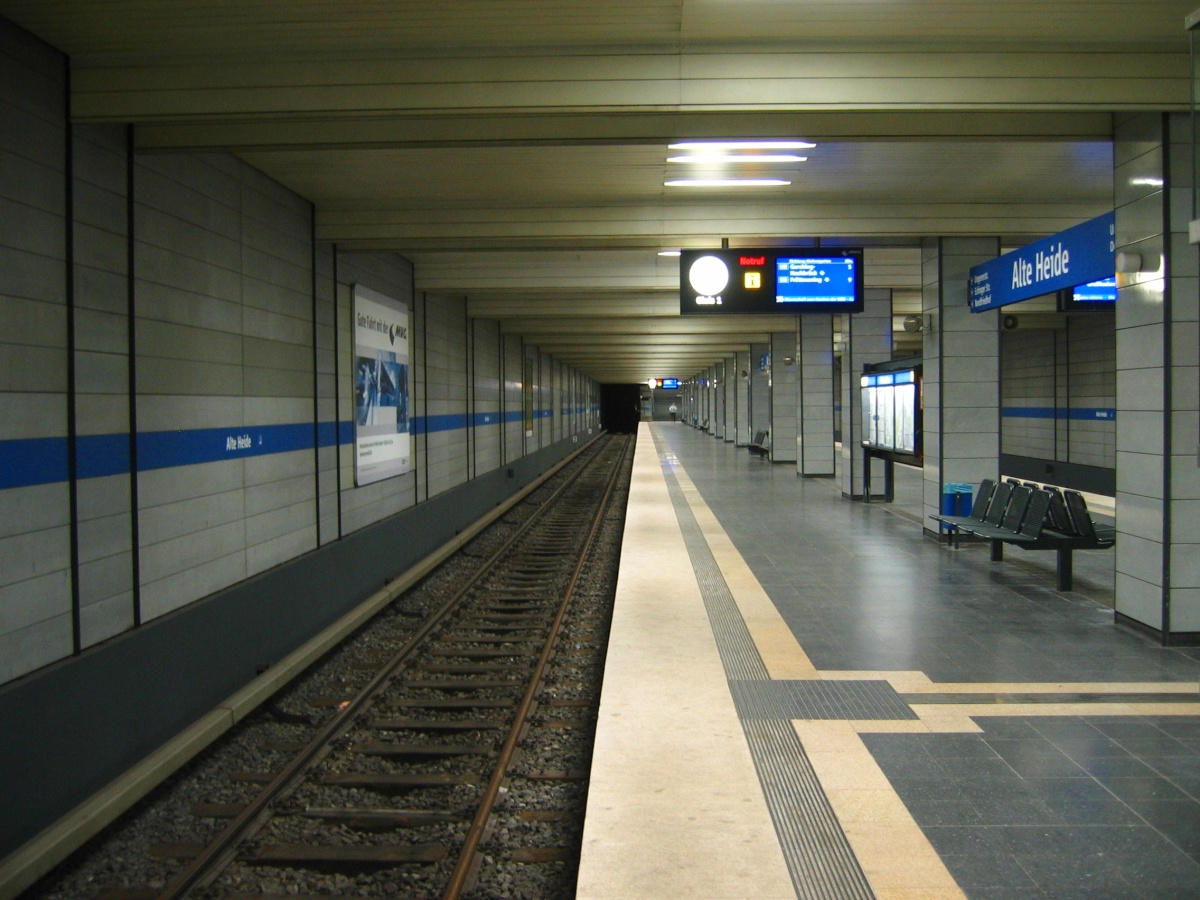

General information
- Location: Schwabing-Freimann; Munich, Germany
- Coordinates: 48°10′43″N 11°36′09″E
- Platforms: Island platform
- Tracks: 2
- Connections: MVV buses

Construction
- Structure type: Underground
- Accessible: Yes

Other information
- Fare zone: : M

History
- Opened: 1971

Services
Preceding station	Munich U-Bahn	Following station
Nordfriedhof towards Klinikum Großhadern	U6	Studentenstadt towards Garching-Forschungszentrum
Location

Alte Heide is an U-Bahn station in Munich on the U6. It was opened on 19 October 1971.
