= Belgradstraße =

Street in Munich

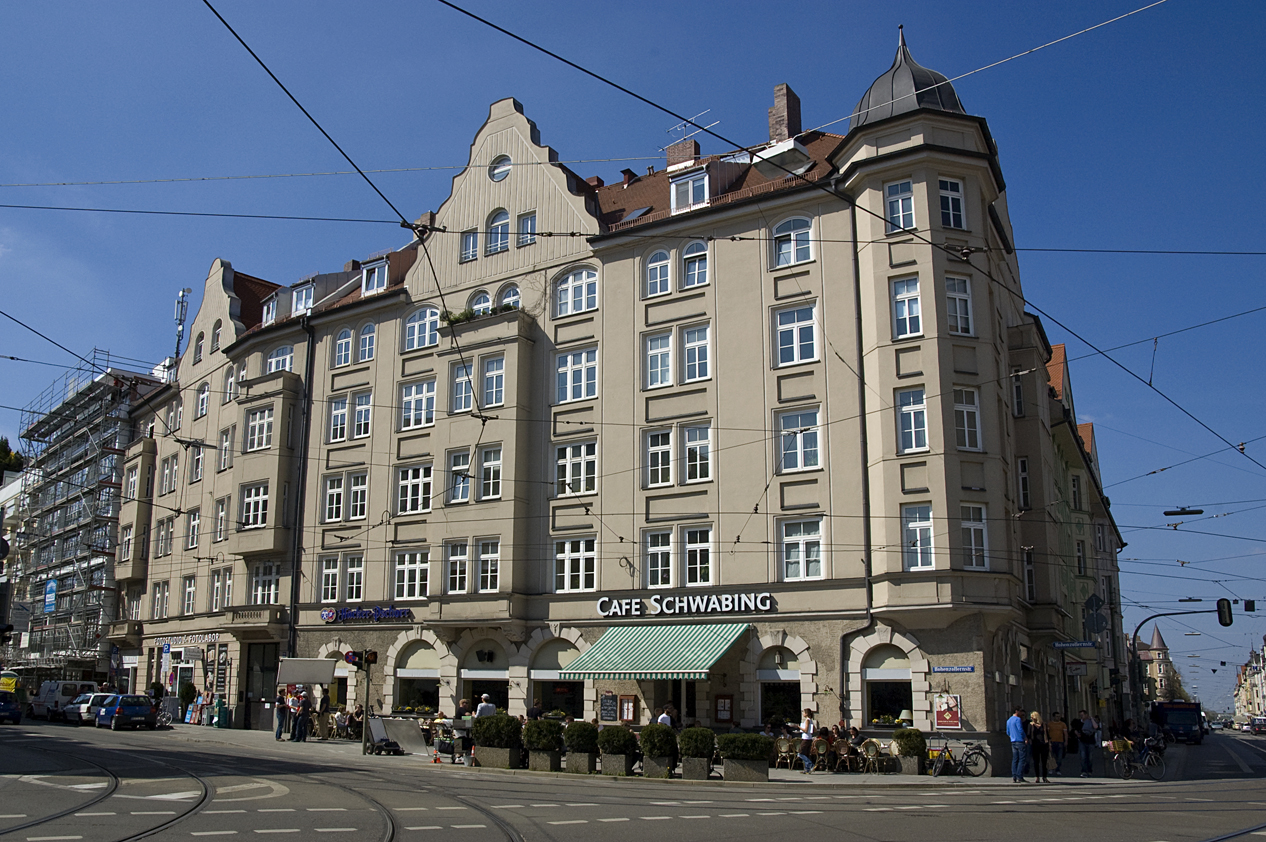
Belgradstraße 1

The Belgradstraße is a 2.0-kilometer-long street in Munich's Schwabing district. It runs in a south–north direction between Kurfürstenplatz and Petuelpark, where it merges into Knorrstraße. The street was named after the Serbian capital Belgrade.

== Today's appearance ==
The southern part of Belgradstraße is characterized by Neo-Renaissance and Art Nouveau buildings from around 1900. Overall, the Bavarian State Office for Monument Protection lists seventeen historical buildings on the Belgradstraße, from Kaiserstraße to the Unertlstraße the road runs along the protected building complex, Nordschwabing (E-1-62-000-42).

The northern part of Belgradstraße, starting from the Scheidplatz, is dominated in the west by Luitpoldpark and Bad Georgenschwaige. At the corner of Belgradstraße to Parzivalstraße is the "ladies club on Luitpoldpark", founded in 1862 by King Maximilian II of Bavaria, which moved in 1956 from the bombed Dragon Castle to the current premises. The northern end of Belgradstraße is formed by the Nymphenburg-Biedersteiner Canal and the Petuelpark.

== Traffic ==
Since 1959 the Munich tram has been operating on Belgradstraße, from Kurfürstenplatz to Scheidplatz, and from 1963 to 1993 the northern part of Belgradstraße was also used by the tram, connecting to the settlement Am Hart. There is still evidence of the route today, a green strip can be seen where the tracks separate between Scheidplatz and Petuelpark.

== History ==
The course of Belgradstraße follows the northern part of the Türkengraben, built in 1702-1704 as a connecting channel from the Nymphenburg-Biedersteiner canal to Munich Residenz and was refilled in 1811 again.

In 1764, the Schwaige St. Georgenschwaige (1568 St. Georgen, 1620 at St. Georgen) was first named at the junction of the Turkish moat and canal. In 1826, an open-air swimming pool was opened here and a restaurant was built in the former bleach house, the so-called "Dutch bleach". In 1850, it was renamed by the owner and became the "Bad Georgenschwaige". In 1850, it was announced in Munich Tagblatt that a license was granted to a Lohnkutscher for passenger trips by horse-drawn omnibuses to Georgenschweige.

Until the incorporation of the district of Schwabing, in 1890, to Munich, the city limit boundary was around Munich, at the height of the later Kurfürstenplatz. In the plan of the royal capital and residence city of Munich from 1858/59, the Belgradstraße is marked as "leading to Georgenschwaig" and apart from a few buildings on the later Kurfürstenplatz, still completely undeveloped. The city of Munich wrote out a competition for the expansion of the city and in 1892 began a construction boom according to a development plan by Theodor Fischer.

In the first third of the 20th century, the then Belgradstraße 57 (1903-1936), with the "Pension Fürmann" was also a culmination of the Schwabinger Bohème. After 1936, the house number was changed to 61. The Swiss Heinrich Fürmann (* 1870, † 1936), operated the pension together with his wife Luise (Lulu), in a converted horse stable. Guests often stayed more than a year, often rent was deferred, food and drink costed almost nothing. As such, the pension attracted artists from all over the world. René Prévot lived for some time in the popular guesthouse, and in his room Ricarda Huch previously lived there.

Ernst Zeno Ichenhäuser grew up in the house of the pension Fürmann. Stefan George lived with his most important son, Friedrich Gundolf, in the gable room of a gardener's house belonging to pension Fürmann, from March 1903 and there he was visited by Maximilian Kronberger. Else Lasker-Schüler and also Franz Jung with his wife Margot were there. Friedrich Georg Jünger followed his resident friend Alexander Mitscherlich, who in turn got to know the two-year-old medical student Melitta Behr there. The latter was later known as Melitta Mitscherlich. Ernst Moritz Engert was a regular guest there, as well as Gustav Wyneken, who lived there with Elisabeth Salomon (later known as Elisabeth Gundolf). The Munich Police Directorate wrote in 1914 about the "famous because of their free intercourse pension", that their owners are "aware of the polices' sharp observation." Karl Wolfskehl, on the other hand, dedicated his poem to Fürmann,"Vater der Fahrenden".

Vater der Fahrenden // Zum Gedächtnis Fürmanns, des Gründers und Erhalters des Künstlerheims an der Belgradstrasse, Schwabing // Lex mihi ars! im Doppelsinn war dein Motto. / Vorm Satan, nicht vor Gott verlorst im Lotto. / Kein Spritzer Spiessergift trügt’ deinen Blankschild, / Im Dom der Herzen stehn als Denkbild, Dankbild / Dein gilbend Haus - Baracke oder Schloss? / Der Saal, wo Lied und Kuss den Alltag schloss, / Doch wer vom Bau pochte umsonst die Tür an, / Vernahm nicht gleich im Chor: „Boheimchen, führ an! …“ / Zum Schluss trog noch dein Freitod schleimgen Tryrann! / Denn jetzt half überlegnen Lachens Wehr nicht, / Betreu uns auch im Ewigen Schwabing, Fürmann, / Auch drüben die berühmte Bowle rühr an / Und kreid auch dort uns nie gestundete Gebühr an!

— Karl Wolfskehl

The often assigned to the George-Kreis, "Schwabinger scandal Countess" Fanny zu Reventlow moved in 1901 temporarily into Belgradstraße.

In 1912, on a brownfield site west of Belgradstraße and Luitpoldpark, in 1934 the Bad Georgenschwaige came to be.

In the 1980s, Jenny Evans operated in Belgradstraße, a well known beyond Munich jazz club under the name „Jenny’s Place“, which in 1987 (in the movie moved to Duisburg) was the "Tatort" of the crime scene thriller "Spielverderber".

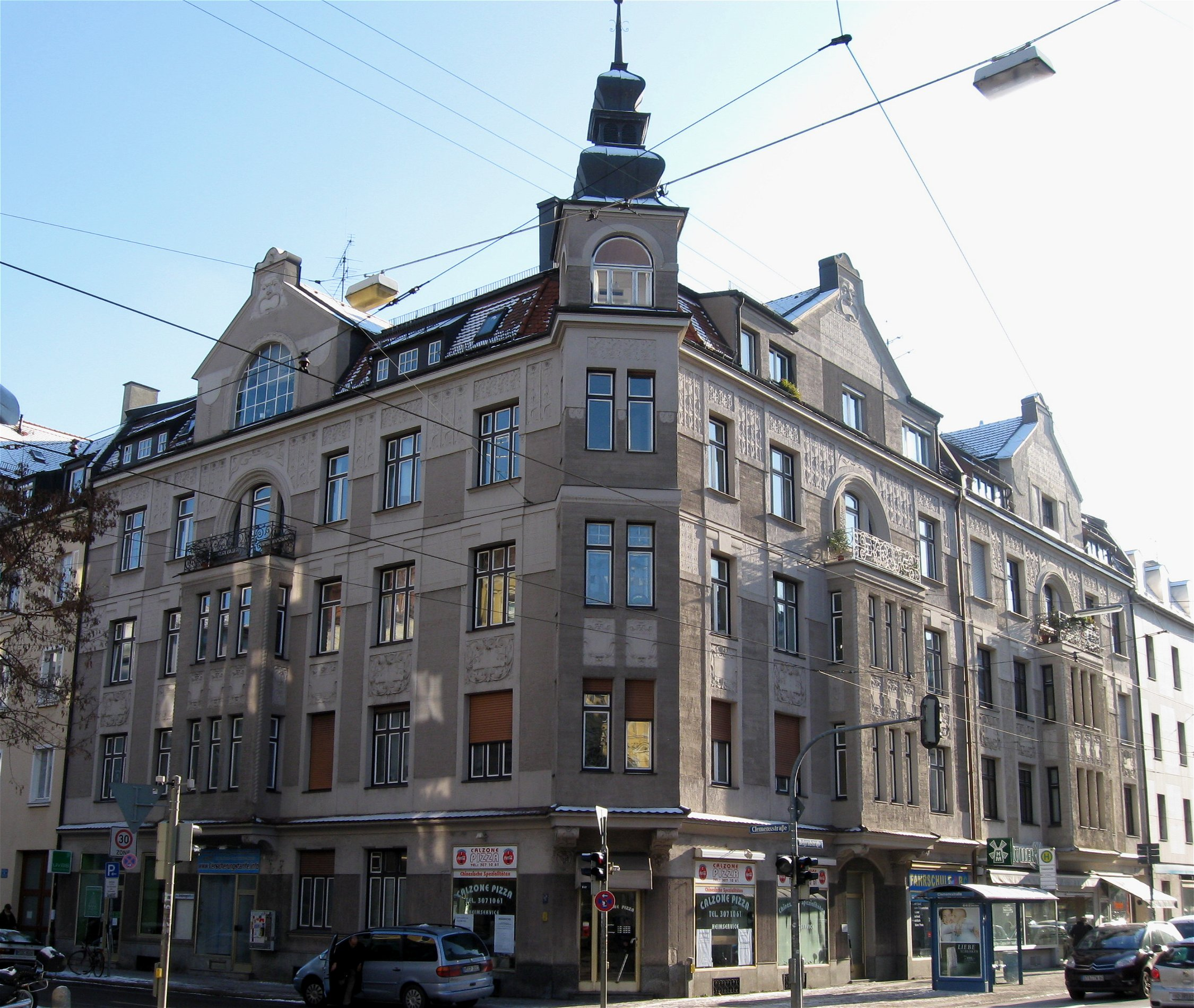
Art Nouveau building from 1899 by Johann Lang in Belgradstraße 24

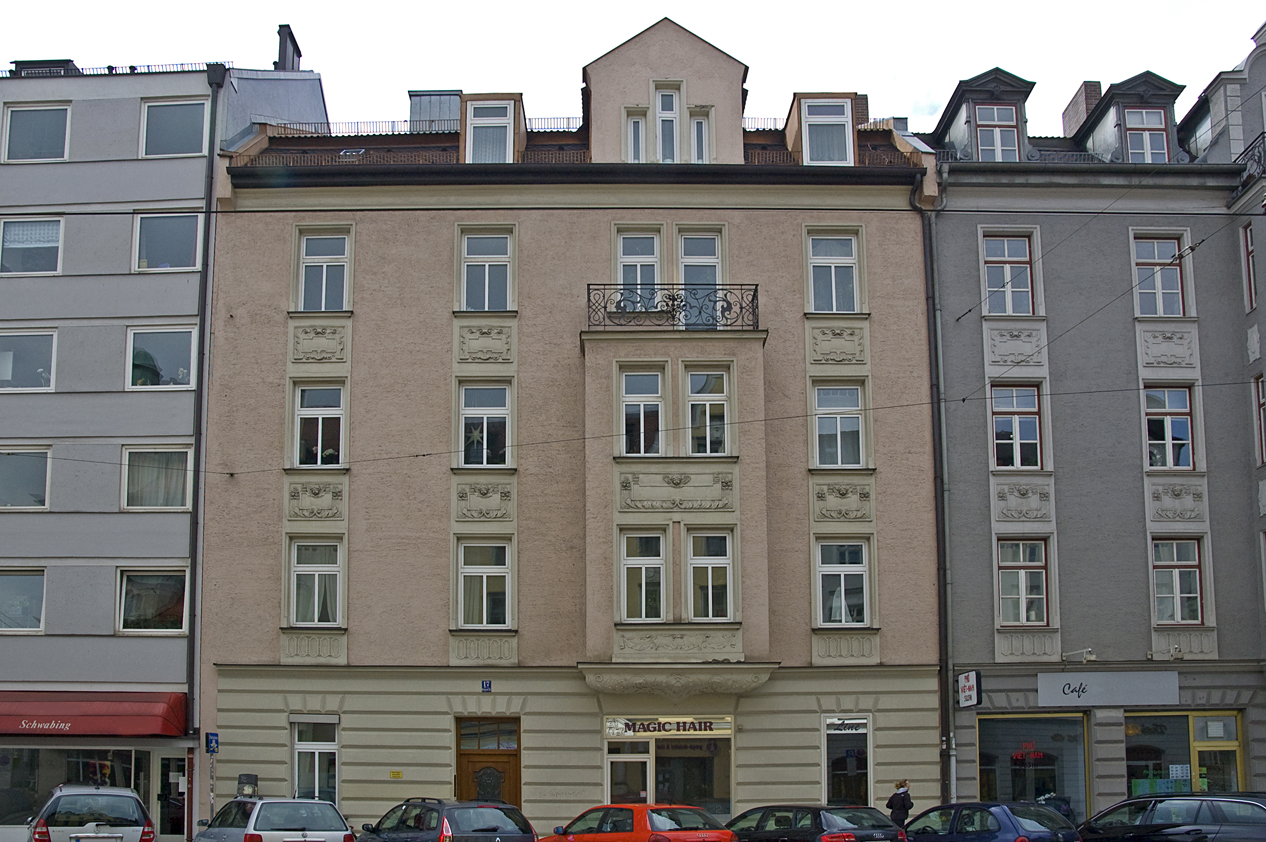
Renaissance style, around 1900; in Belgradstraße 19

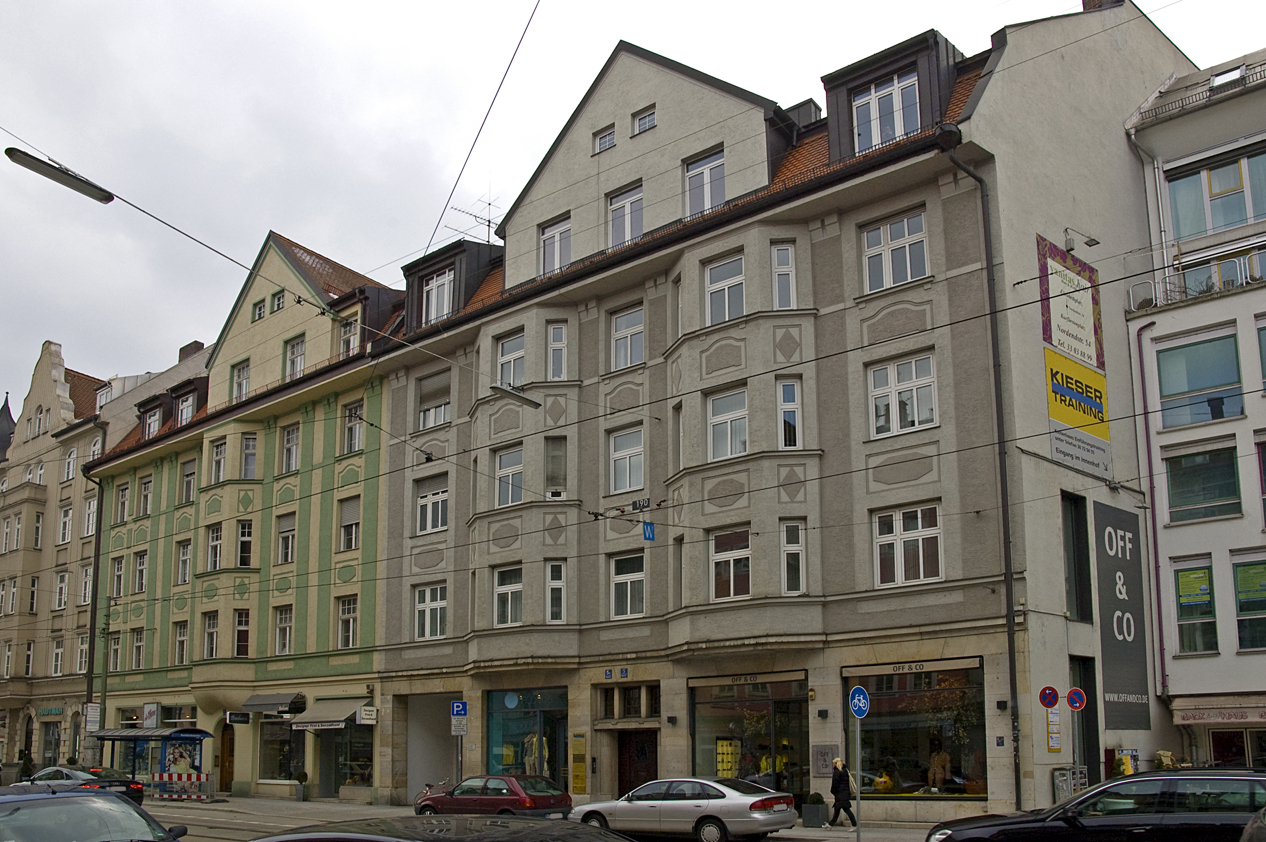
Belgradstraße 5

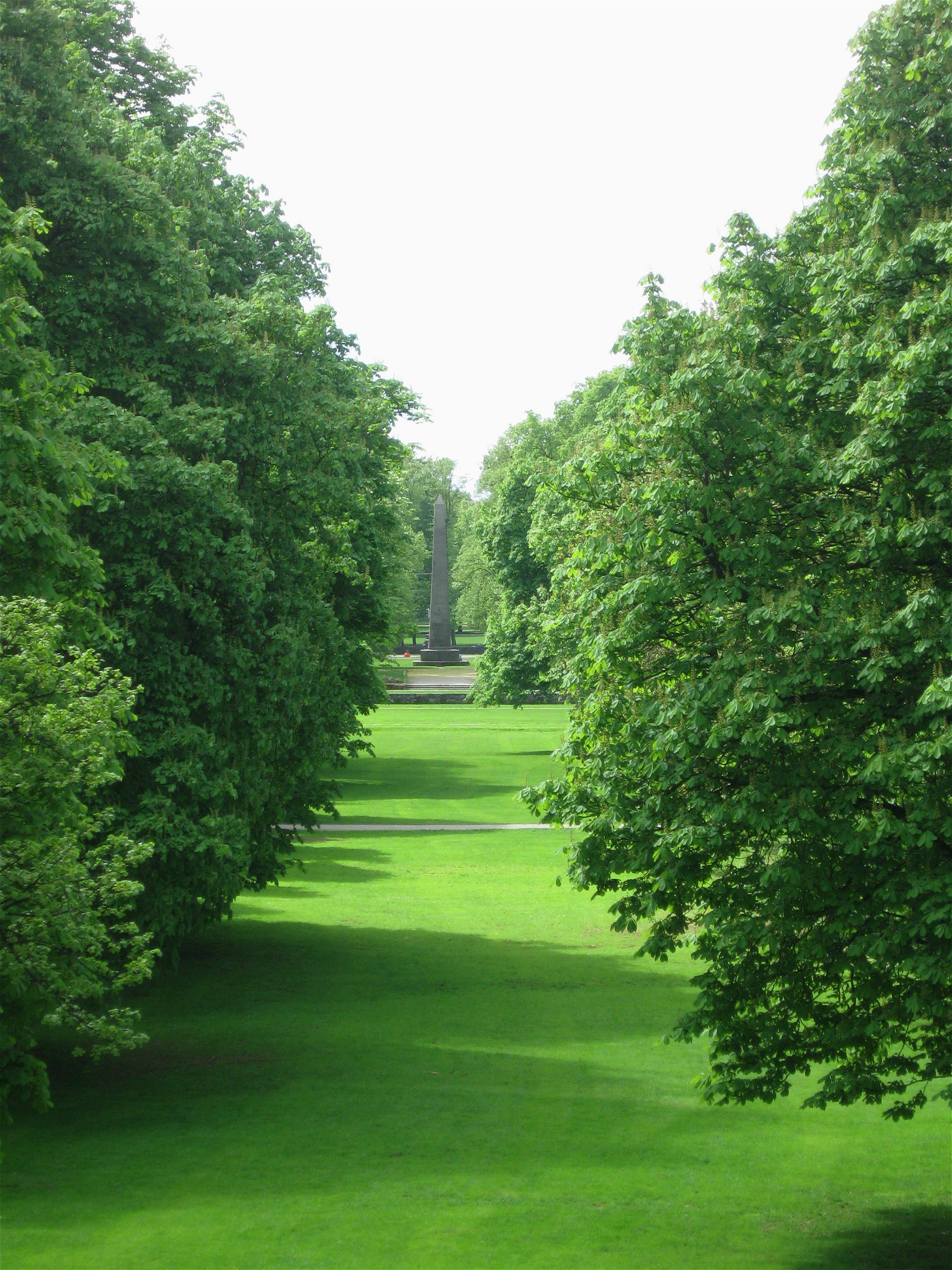
Luitpoldpark
