= Studentenstadt station =

Station of the Munich U-Bahn

Studentenstadt
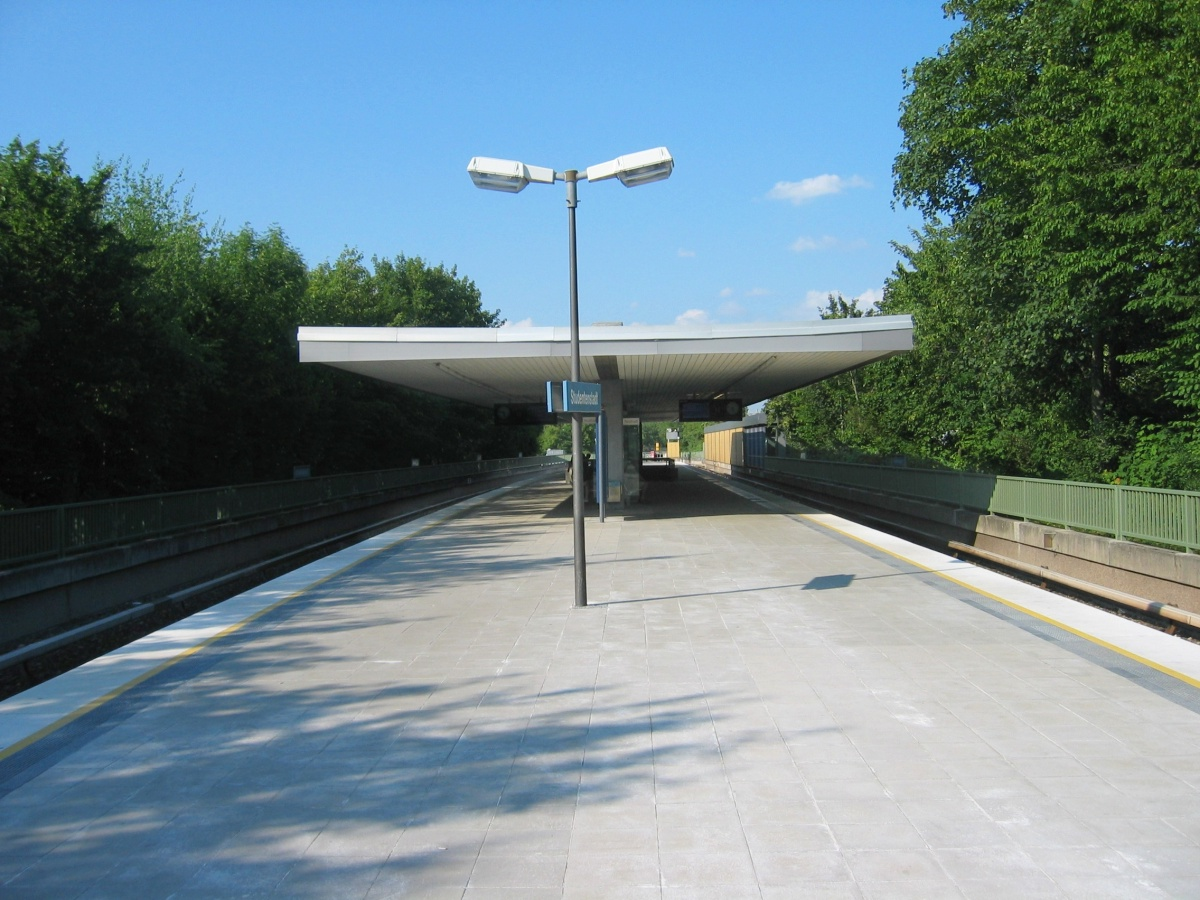

General information
- Location: Schwabing-Freimann; Munich, Germany
- Coordinates: 48°11′01″N 11°36′28″E
- Platforms: Island platform
- Tracks: 2
- Connections: MVV buses

Construction
- Structure type: At grade
- Accessible: Yes

Other information
- Fare zone: : M

Services
| Preceding station | Munich U-Bahn | Following station |
|---|---|---|
| Alte Heide towards Klinikum Großhadern | U6 | Freimann towards Garching-Forschungszentrum |
Location

Studentenstadt is a Munich U-Bahn station in the borough of Schwabing-Freimann. It services the Studentenstadt that provides accommodation for university students.
