= Jenny Evans =

British-born German singer

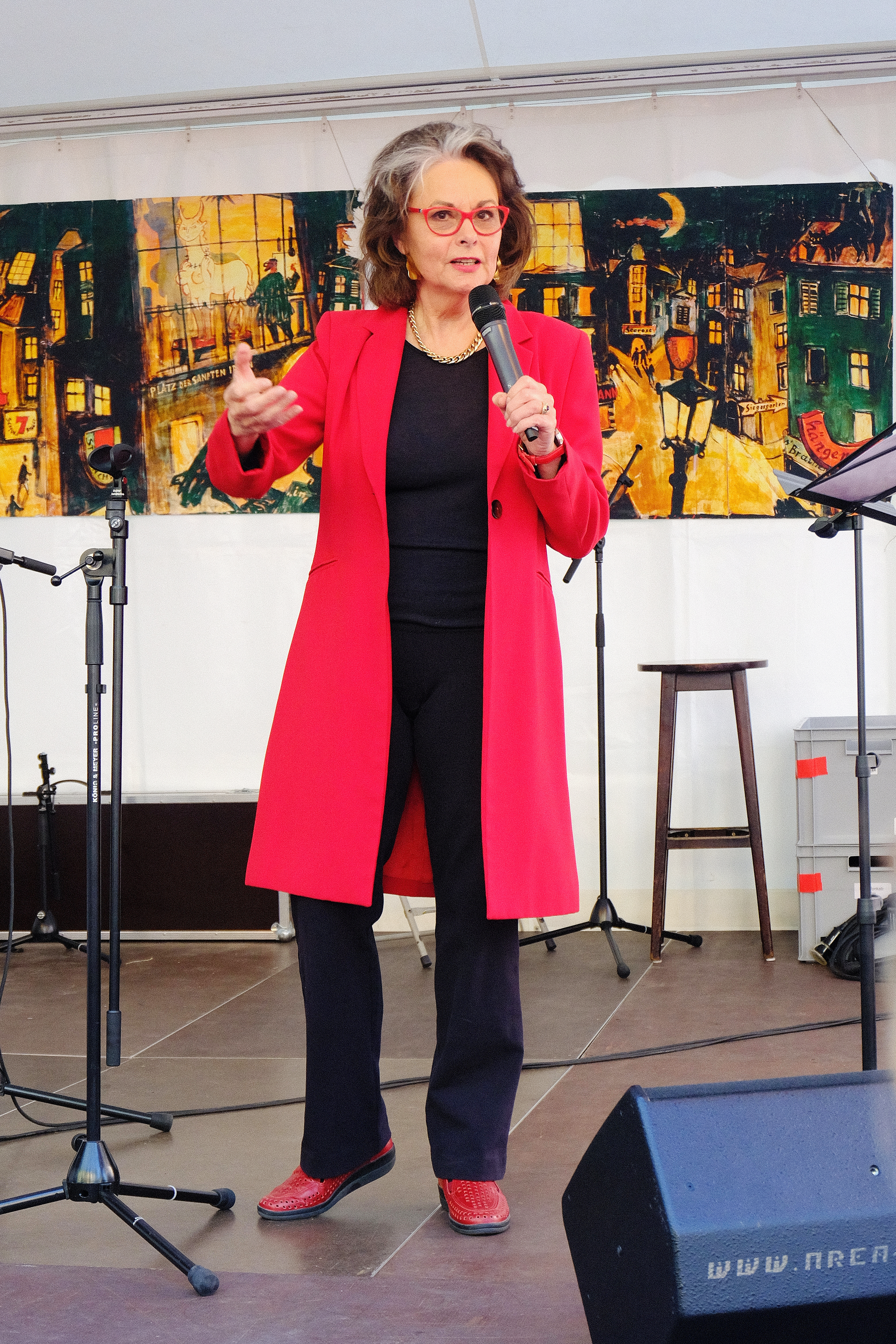
Jenny Evans, 2019 in Munich, Germany

Jenny Evans (1954) is a British-born naturalized German jazz singer. She was also known as owner of Jenny's Place, a jazz club in Munich's Schwabing district.

== Discography ==
- Nuages
