= Nordfriedhof station =

Station of the Munich U-Bahn

Nordfriedhof
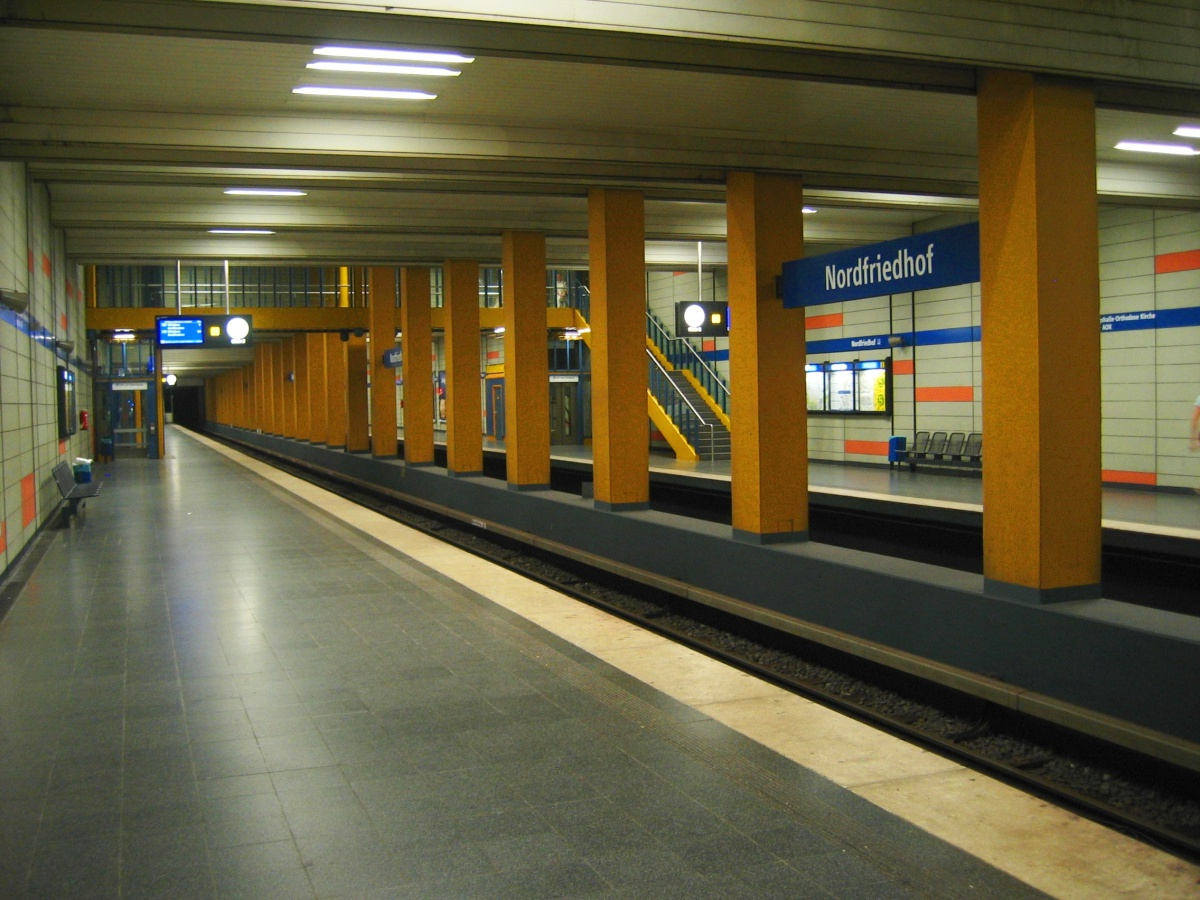

General information
- Location: Schwabing-Freimann; Munich, Germany
- Coordinates: 48°10′23″N 11°35′48″E
- Platforms: 2 side platforms
- Tracks: 2
- Connections: MVV buses

Construction
- Structure type: Underground
- Accessible: Yes

Other information
- Fare zone: : M

Services
Preceding station	Munich U-Bahn	Following station
Dietlindenstraße towards Klinikum Großhadern	U6	Alte Heide towards Garching-Forschungszentrum
Location

Nordfriedhof is an U-Bahn station in Munich on the U6 which opened on 19 October 1971 and is located in Schwabing. The station was named after the nearby Nordfriedhof.

== Station details ==
Nordfriedhof is located between Dietlindenstraße and Alte Heide stations. Nearby locations include housing estates, offices, commercial establishments, Nordfriedhof, and several hotels.

The station uses a side platform configuration.
