= Petuelpark =

Park in Munich, Germany

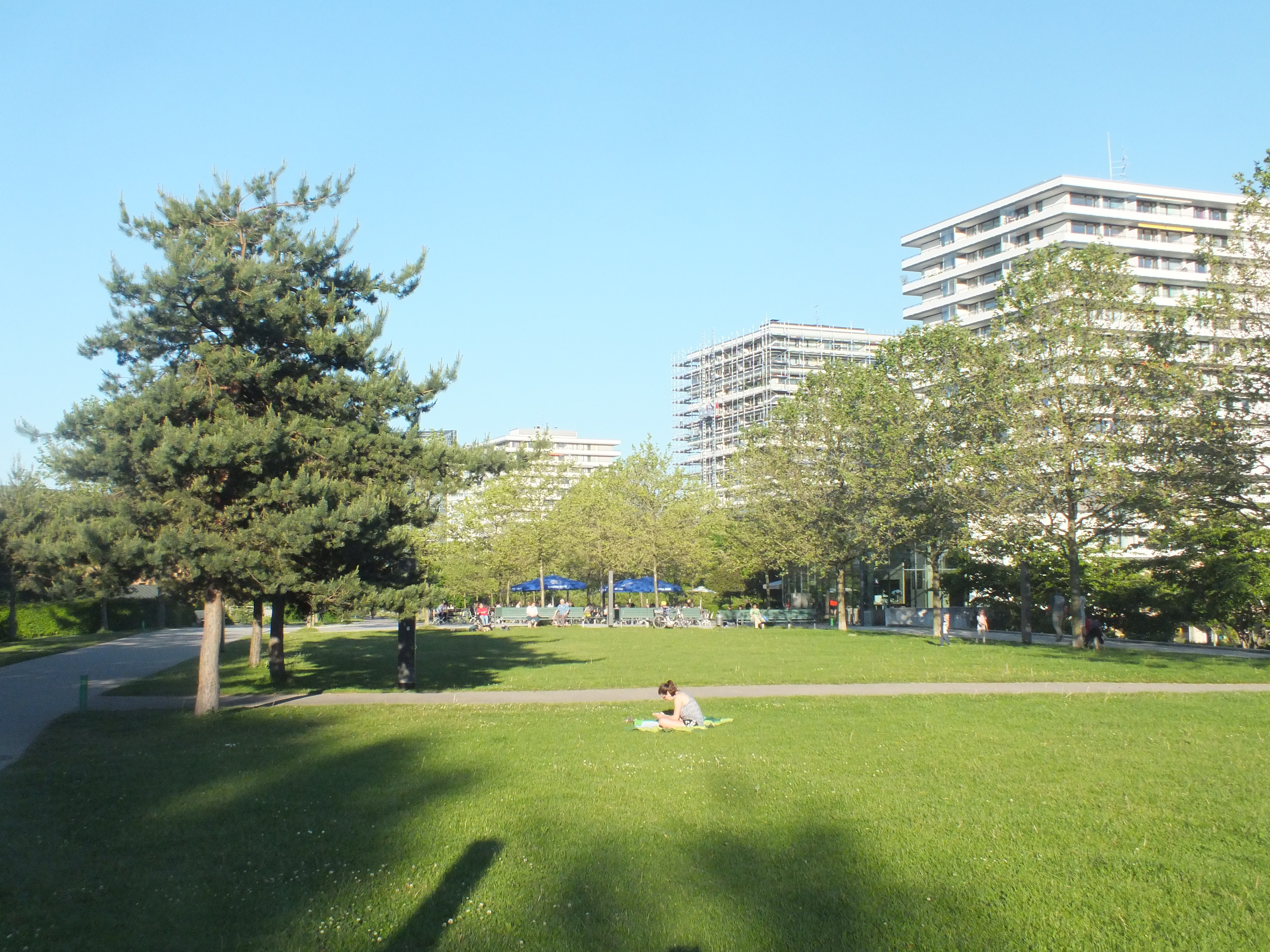
Petuelpark

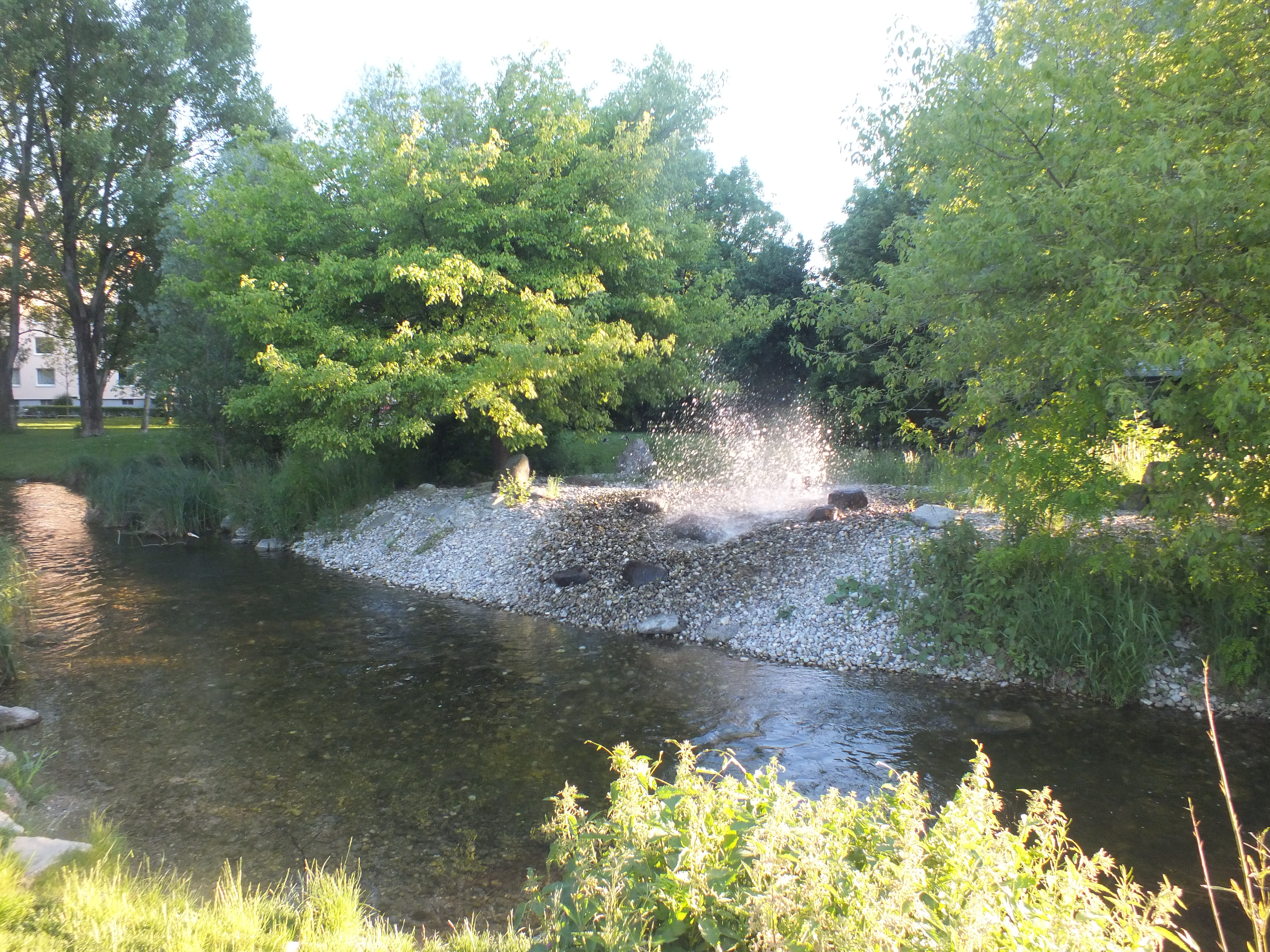
River in the Petuelpark

The Petuelpark is a 7.4-hectare (18-acre) park situated in between Schwabing and Milbertshofen-Am Hart in Munich, Germany.
