= Münchner Verkehrs- und Tarifverbund =

Transit authority of the city of Munich

Münchner Verkehrs- und Tarifverbund (MVV)
- Industry: Public transport
- Founded: 1971
- Headquarters: Munich, Germany
- Area served: Greater Munich

MVV Area expansions since 2015

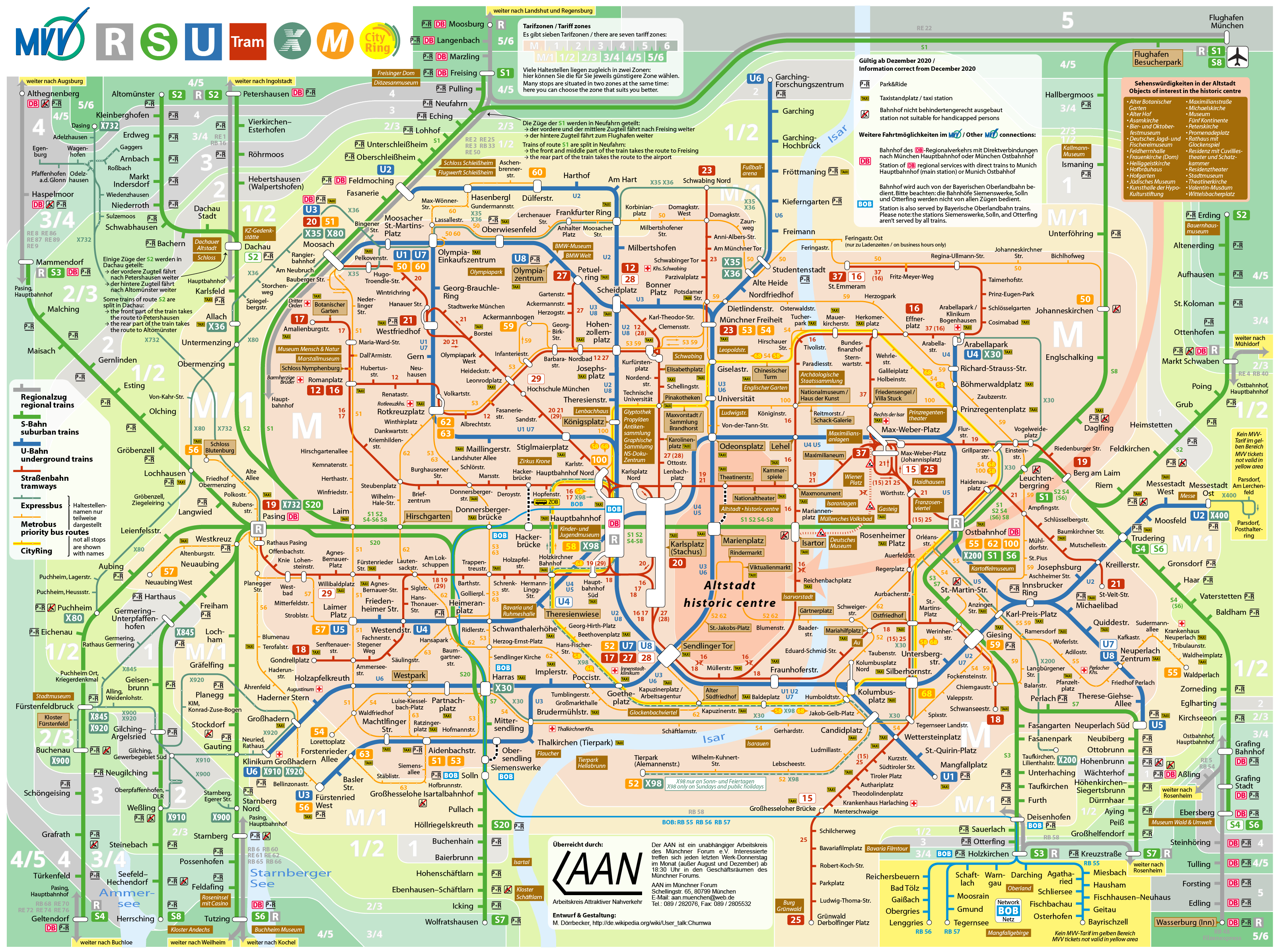
Public transport network (before December 10, 2023)

Ridership between 1996 and 2019

The Münchner Verkehrs- und Tarifverbund (MVV; Munich Transport and Tariff Association) is the transit authority of the city of Munich, the capital of the German state of Bavaria. Its jurisdiction covers the city and its surrounding area, responsible for the Munich S-Bahn commuter trains, the Munich U-Bahn, the Munich tramway and buses.

The MVV coordinates transport and fares in an area consisting of the city of Munich and, as of December 2024, ten surrounding districts as well as the independent city of Rosenheim. It is jointly owned by the state of Bavaria, the cities of Munich and Rosenheim, as well as the ten member districts.

At its inception in 1971, the MVV consisted of the city of Munich as well as its eight surrounding districts (with only Bad Tölz-Wolfratshausen's northern half being integrated). This remained unchanged until December 10, 2023, when the districts of Rosenheim and Miesbach, the southern half of the district of Bad Tölz-Wolfratshausen, as well as the independent city of Rosenheim were integrated. The districts of Landsberg am Lech and Weilheim-Schongau joined the MVV as well, on January 1, 2025.

As of November 2025, several further expansions of the MVV's jurisdiction are planned, with the district of Garmisch-Partenkirchen set to join the MVV on January 1, 2026, while there are no fixed dates yet for the expansion to the districts of Mühldorf am Inn and Landshut, as well as the independent city of Landshut.

List of districts covered by the MVV as of November 2025:

- Landkreis Bad Tölz-Wolfratshausen
- Landkreis Dachau
- Landkreis Ebersberg
- Landkreis Erding
- Landkreis Freising
- Landkreis Fürstenfeldbruck
- Landkreis Miesbach
- Landkreis München
- Landkreis Rosenheim (including the independent city of Rosenheim)
- Landkreis Starnberg
- Landsberg am Lech
- Weilheim-Schongau

Transport services are provided by over 40 companies. These include the Bayerische Oberlandbahn, the Deutsche Bahn that also operates the S-Bahn, the Münchner Verkehrsgesellschaft that operates the U-Bahn, tramway and city buses, together with multiple operators of regional trains and buses.
