= Werneck (surname) =

Werneck is a German surname. Notable people with the surname include:

- Cassio Werneck, Brazilian martial artist
- Franz von Werneck (1748–1806), Austrian military leader
- Rafael Werneck (born 2005), Brazilian footballer
- Reinhard von Werneck (1757–1842), German garden manager
- Tatá Werneck (born 1983), Brazilian actress, comedian, and musician
