= Föhringer Ring =

Street in Munich, Germany

Coordinates: 48°11′31″N 11°36′53″E

The Föhringer Ring is a roughly 2.5 km long inner city street in Munich. It passes through the district of Freimann and is a part of the Outer Ring.

The Föhringer Ring runs from the Frankfurter Ring to Effnerstraße, and crosses over the Isar on the Herzog-Heinrich-Brücke. It runs through the municipal area of Unterföhring on the East side. The Basispyramide Unterföhring is situated at the transition to Effnerstraße, from which the topographical surveying of Bavaria took its starting point at the beginning of the 19th century.

The Beach arena, the Max Planck Institute for Physics, the tennis club MTTC Iphitos, as well as the beer garden Aumeister are located on the Föhringer Ring. To the south is the Studentenstadt and the northern part of the Englischer Garten. To the north is a work site of the Bayerischer Rundfunk, to the north-east is the cogeneration plant north.

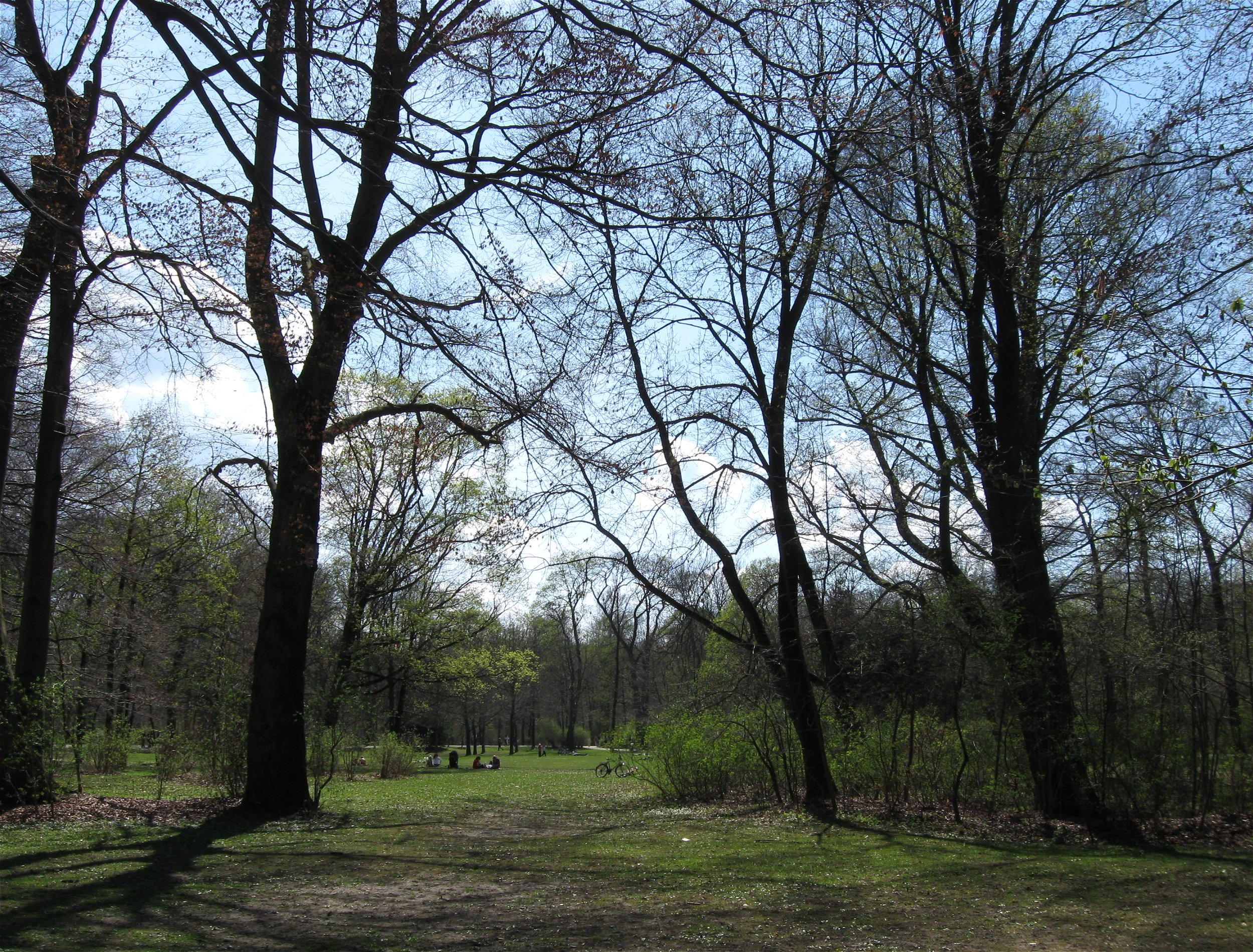
Englischer Garten

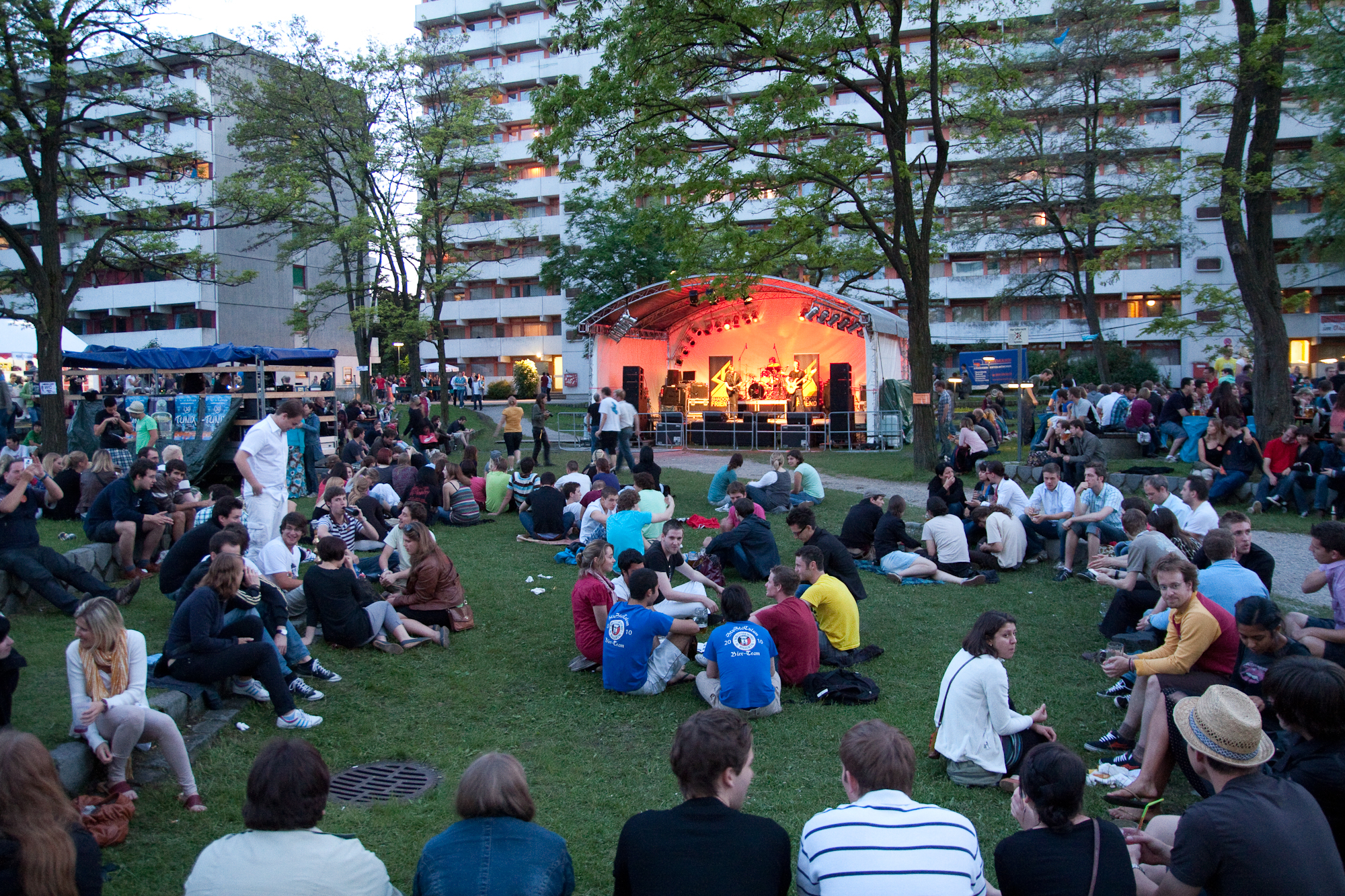
Studentenstadt

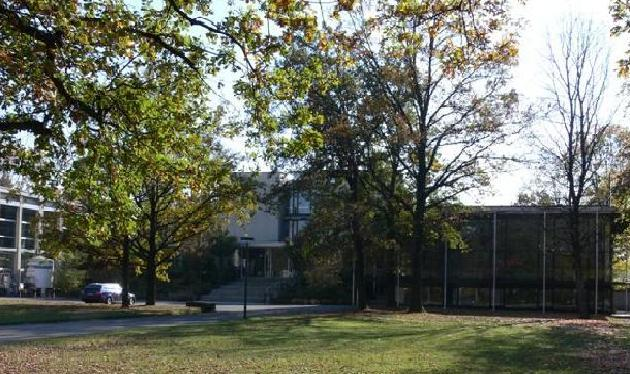
Max Planck Institute for Physics

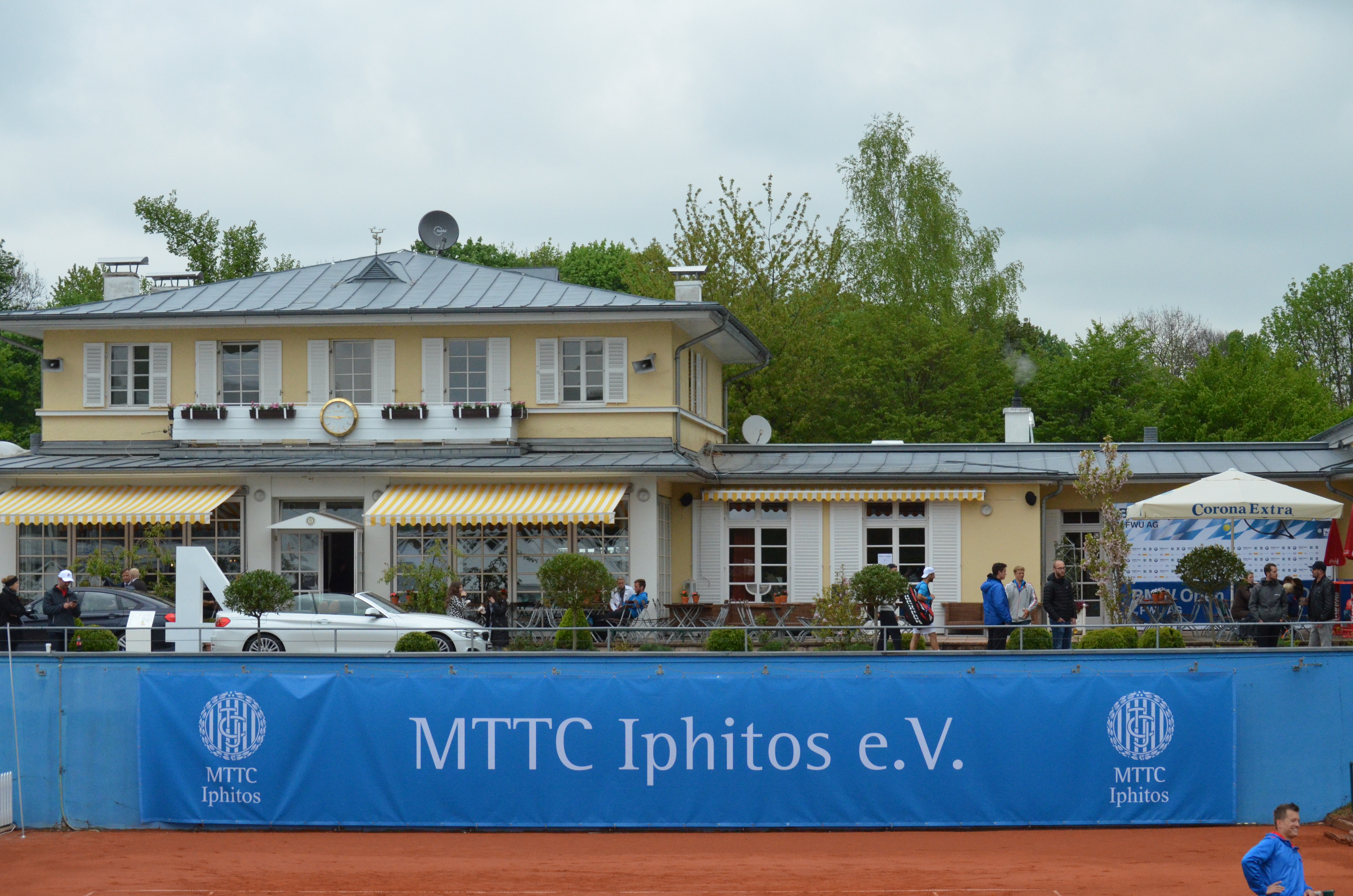
MTTC Iphitos

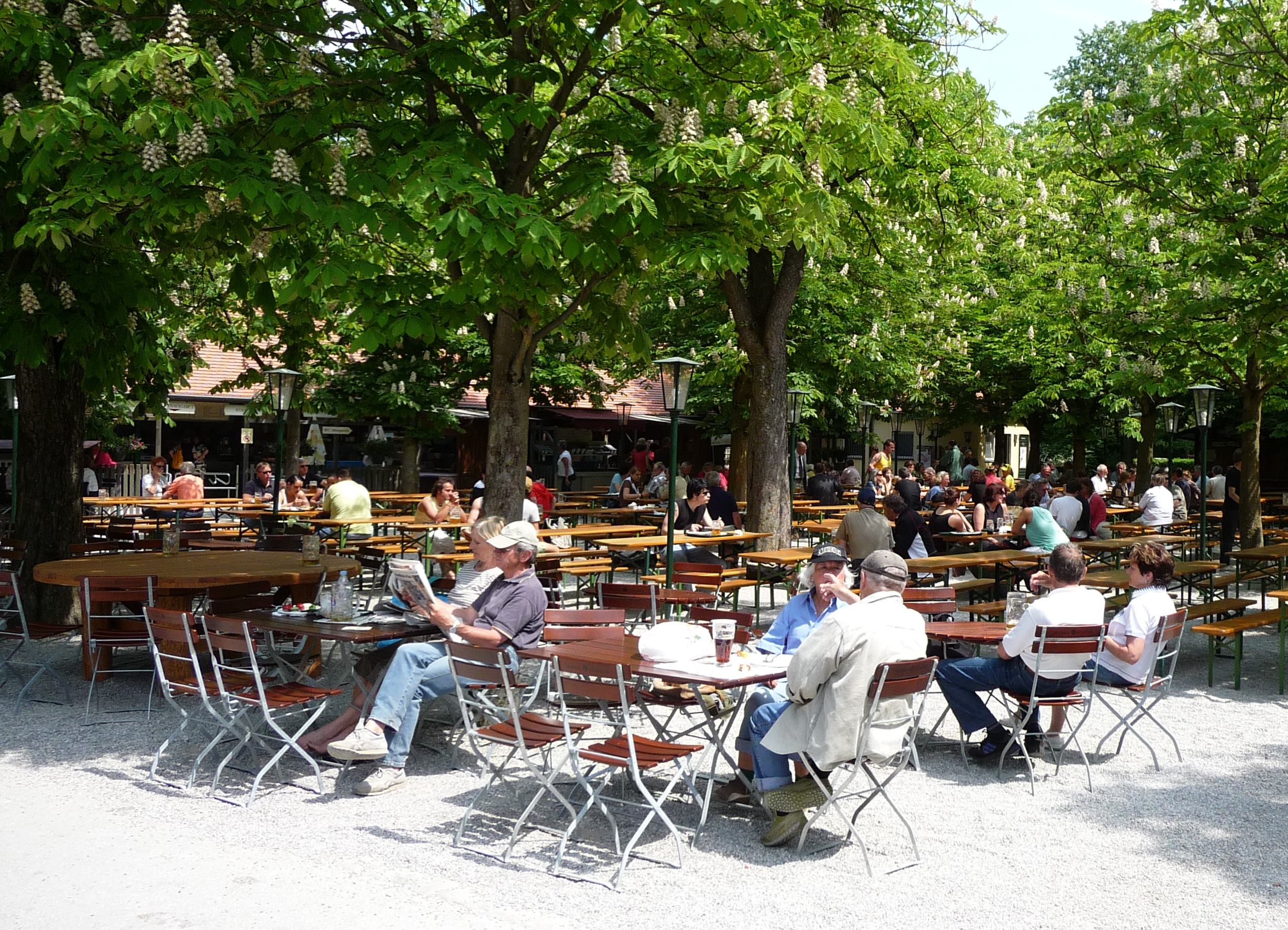
Aumeister

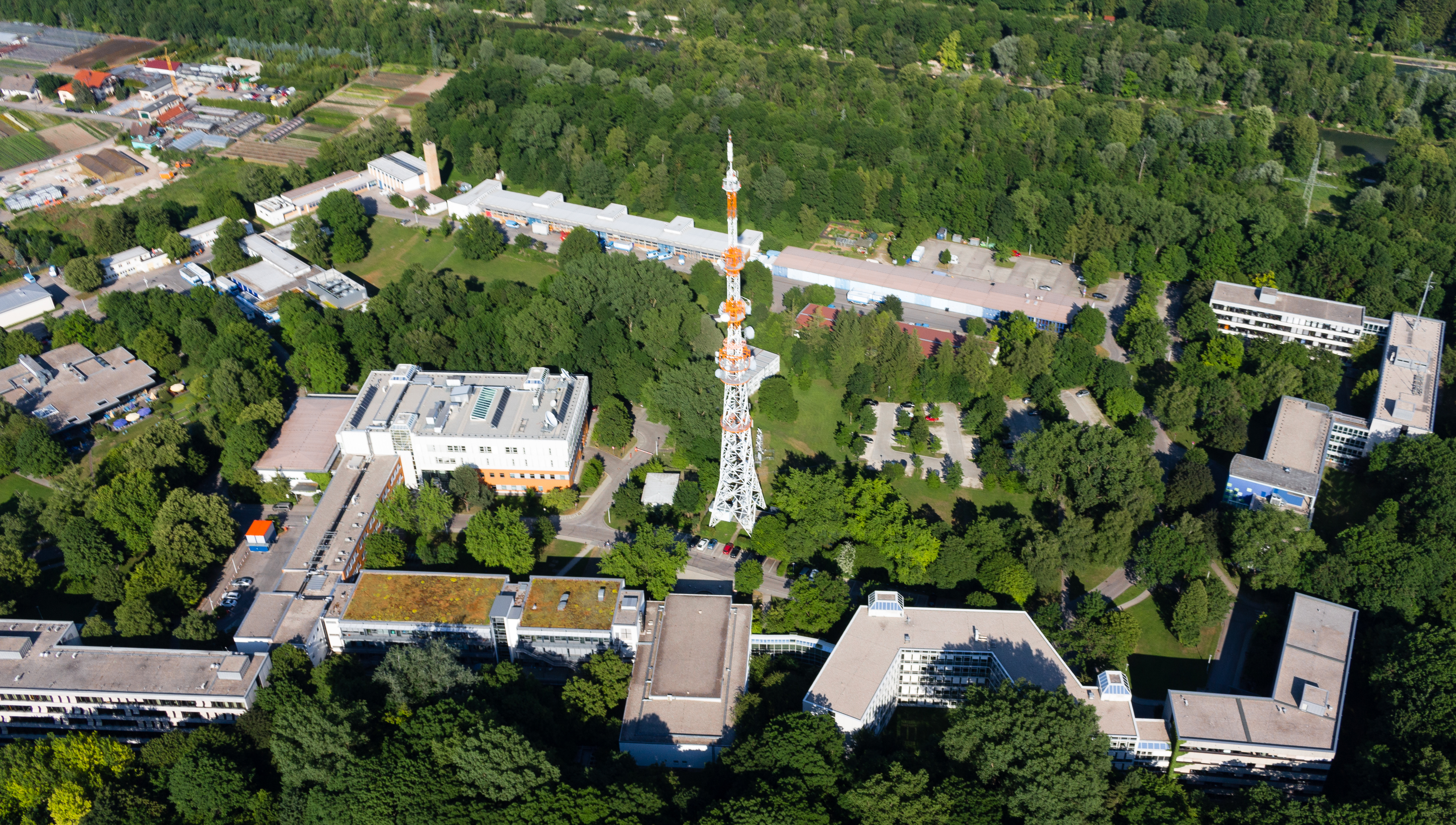
Bayerischer Rundfunk

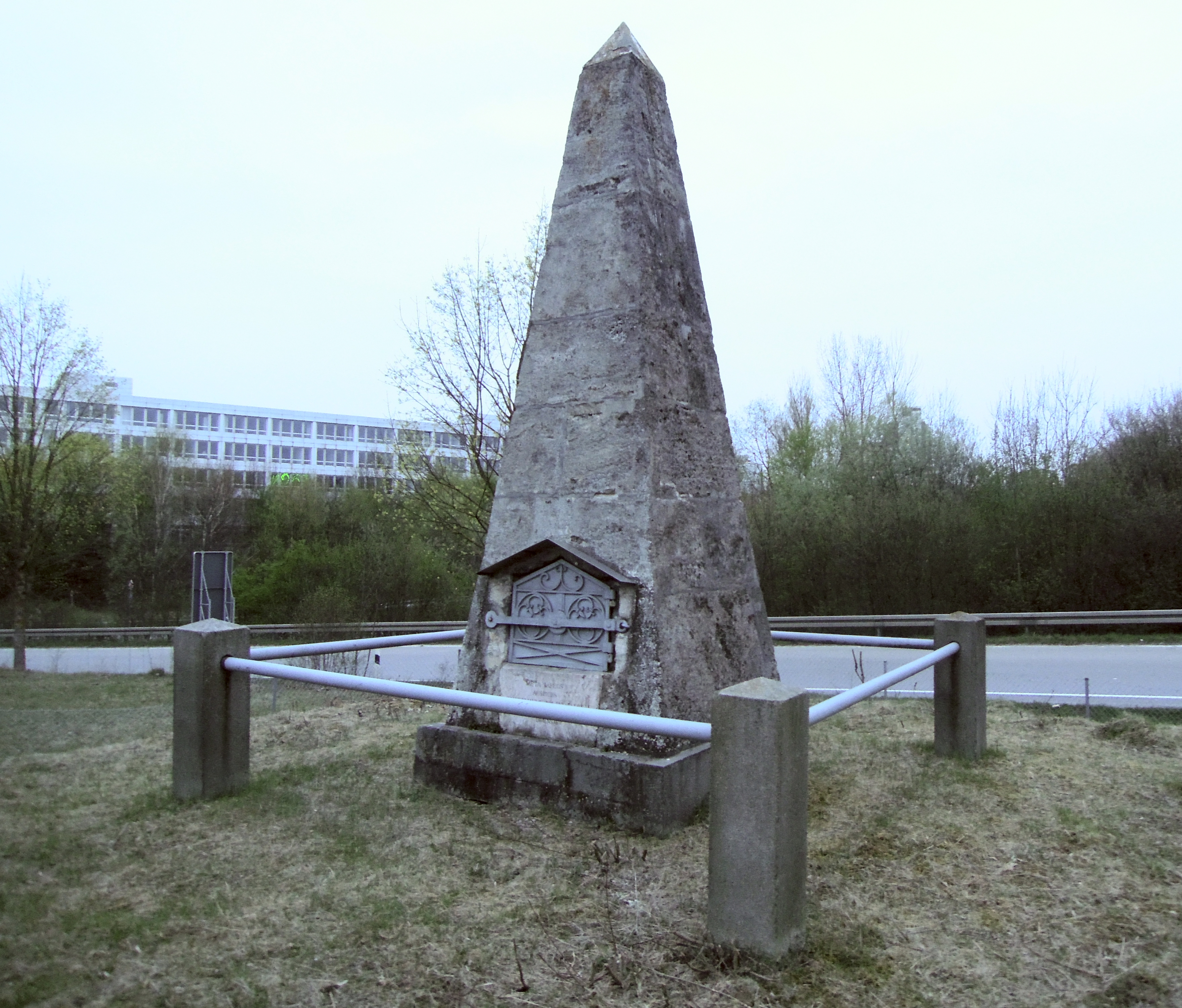
Basispyramide Unterföhring
