= Aumeister =

Coordinates: 48°11′9.6″N 11°37′1.4″E

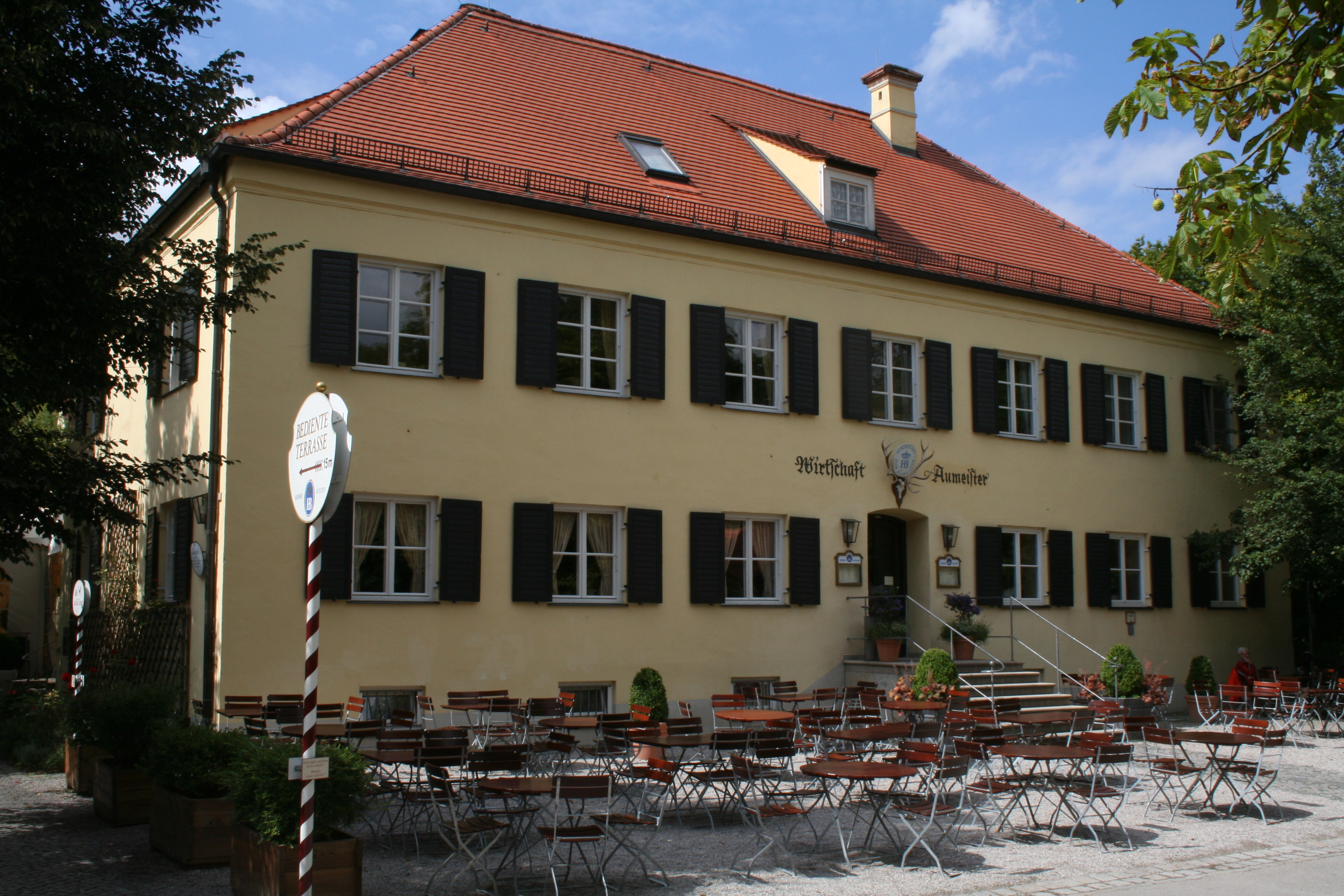
The Aumeister restaurant.

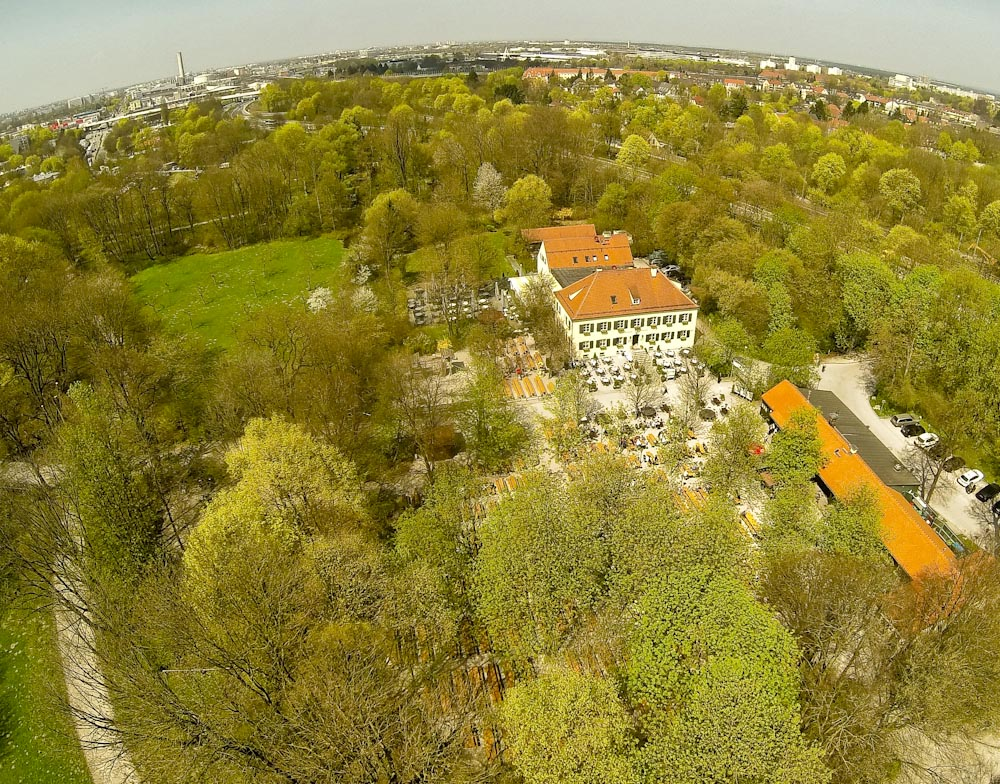
Aerial view of the Aumeister beer garden.

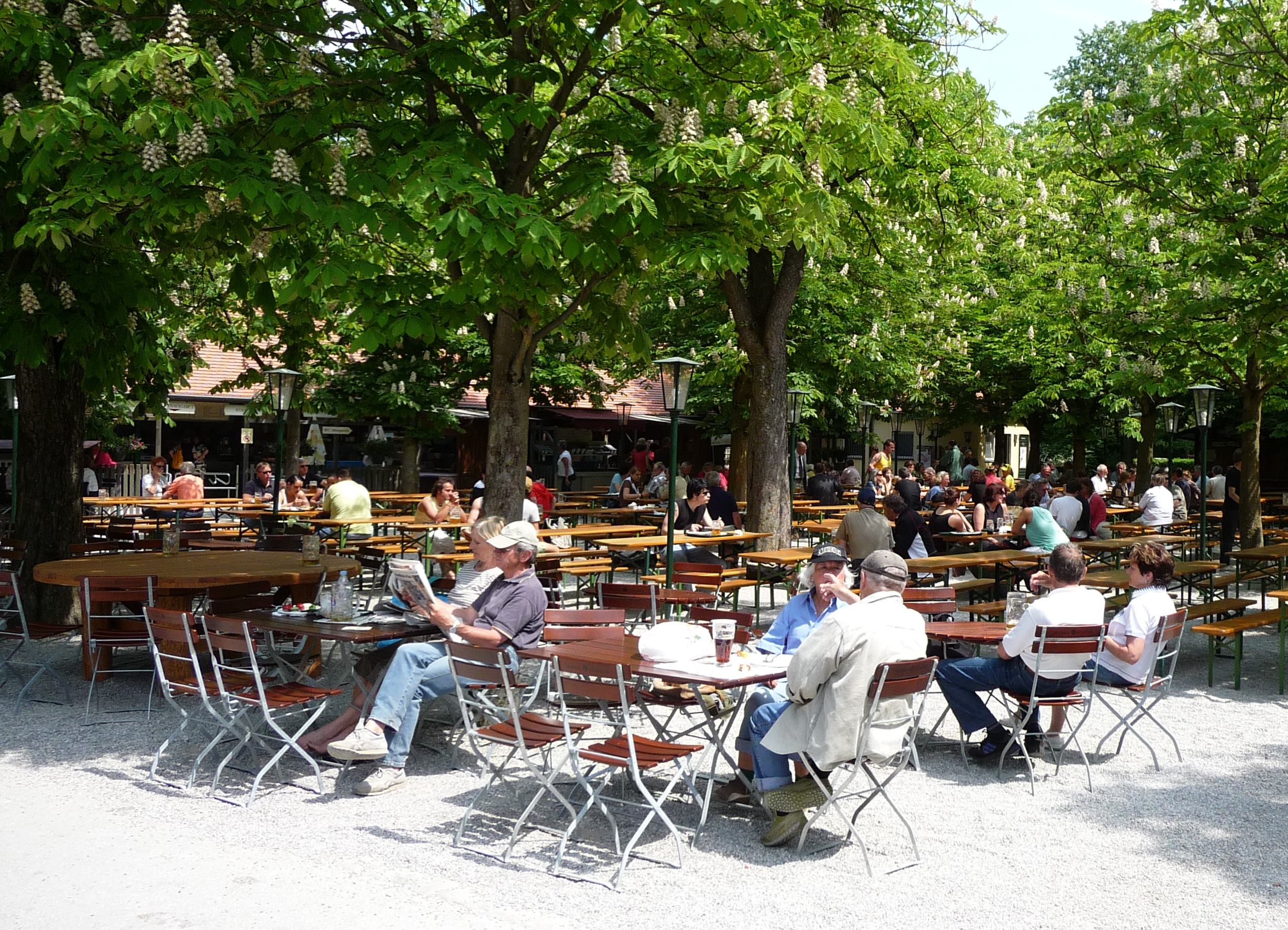
The Aumeister beer garden.

Aumeister (German pronunciation: [ˈaʊˌmaɪstɐ]) is a pub and beer garden in Munich, Germany, with 2500 guest places. It is located at the northern end of the Englischer Garten in the meadow south of the Föhringer Ring and east of the Studentenstadt area in the Kulturheim neighbourhood of the Freimann district.

== History ==
After the foundation of the Englischer Garten, the Aujägermeister house was relocated from Altstadt-Lehel to the northern edge of Freimann Flur and became part of the new neighbourhood of Kulturheim in 1803, together with three newly built gardens. From 1810, to 1811, the new master builder Joseph Deiglmayr erected a new inn building at the site of the old garden inn in the form of a two-storey hip-roofed building in the neoclassicist style, which came to be called "Aumeister" in modern times. The building is protected. As the hunt master not only had to take care of the game in this part of the Isar meadow area, but also entertain the hunting guests, Aumeister became popular as a refreshment place even before the hunt. In 1845, it was described as a "comfortable place frequented by the upper class". Aumeister became a beloved inn with a nearby beer garden, which is frequented by visitors to this day. Aumeister became a part of Freimann in 1808 and was annexed to Munich in 1931 in connection with it.

In 1972, Aumeister served as a turning point in the men's marathon at the 1972 Summer Olympics. Blue markings depicting the marathon route remained at the Englischer Garten for over two decades.

== Literature ==
- Brigitte Fingerle-Trischler: Freimann im Münchner Norden. Volk Verlag, Munich 2018, ISBN 978-3-86222-274-2.
- Marion Maurer: Freimann – eine Gemeinde im Schatten der Großstadt. Buchendorfer Verlag, München 1985.
- Thomas Mann: Der Tod in Venedig. Fischer TaschenBibliothek, 1912.
