= Outer Ring (Munich) =

Ring road in Munich, Germany

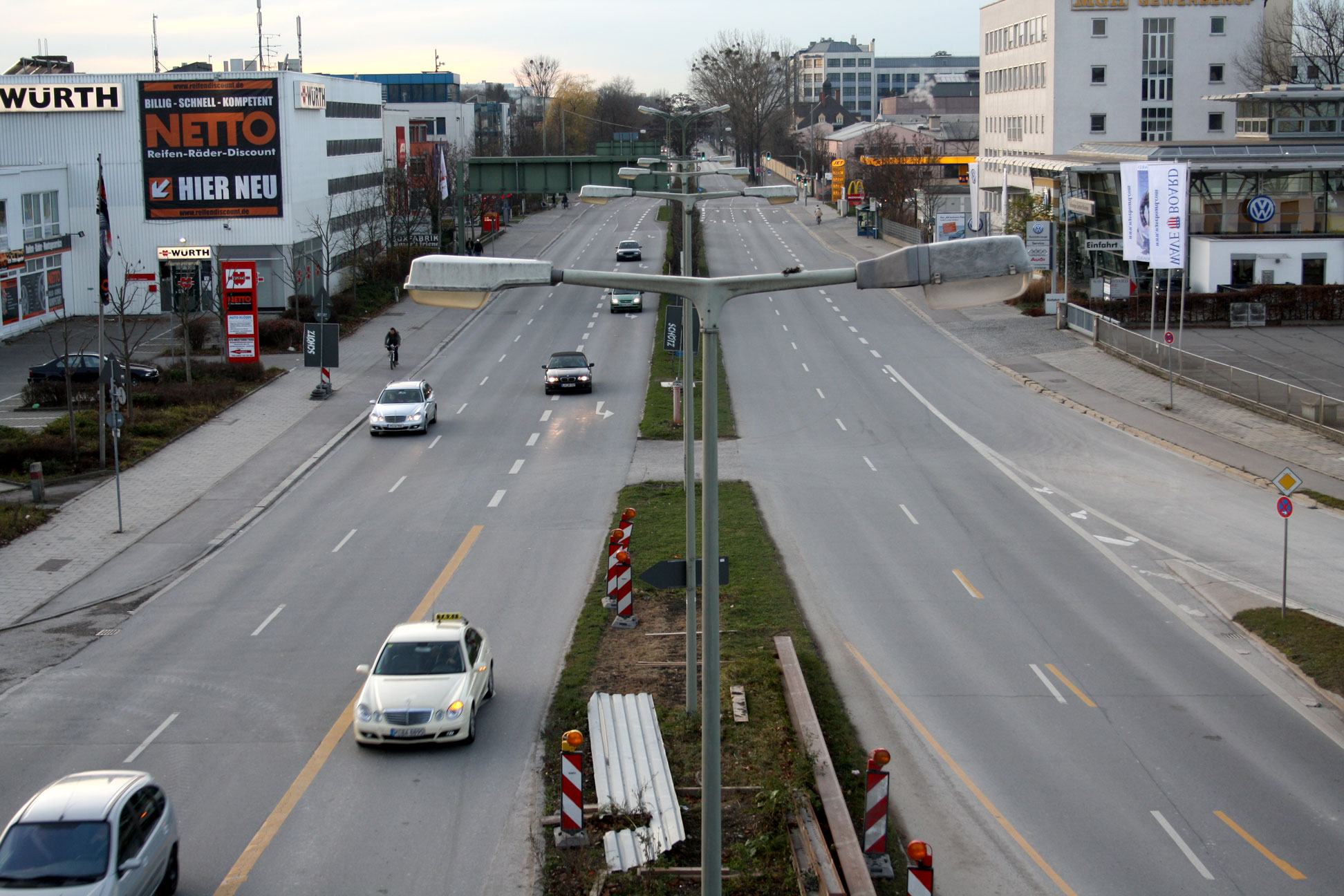
The Frankfurter Ring, a part of the Outer Ring

The Outer Ring is an only partially completed ring road in Munich.

== Routes ==
The Outer Ring was not planned as a circular street, but was planned as a series of relatively straight streets that would be connected by curved sections of road. However, only parts of the original plan were constructed. For example, the bridge over the Isar in the south was never built. On the other hand, the northern section was built with a bridge over the Isar, which was originally not planned because of the Autobahn bridge planned to be located relatively close to it down the Isar.
