= Reinhard von Werneck =

German naturalist (1757–1842)

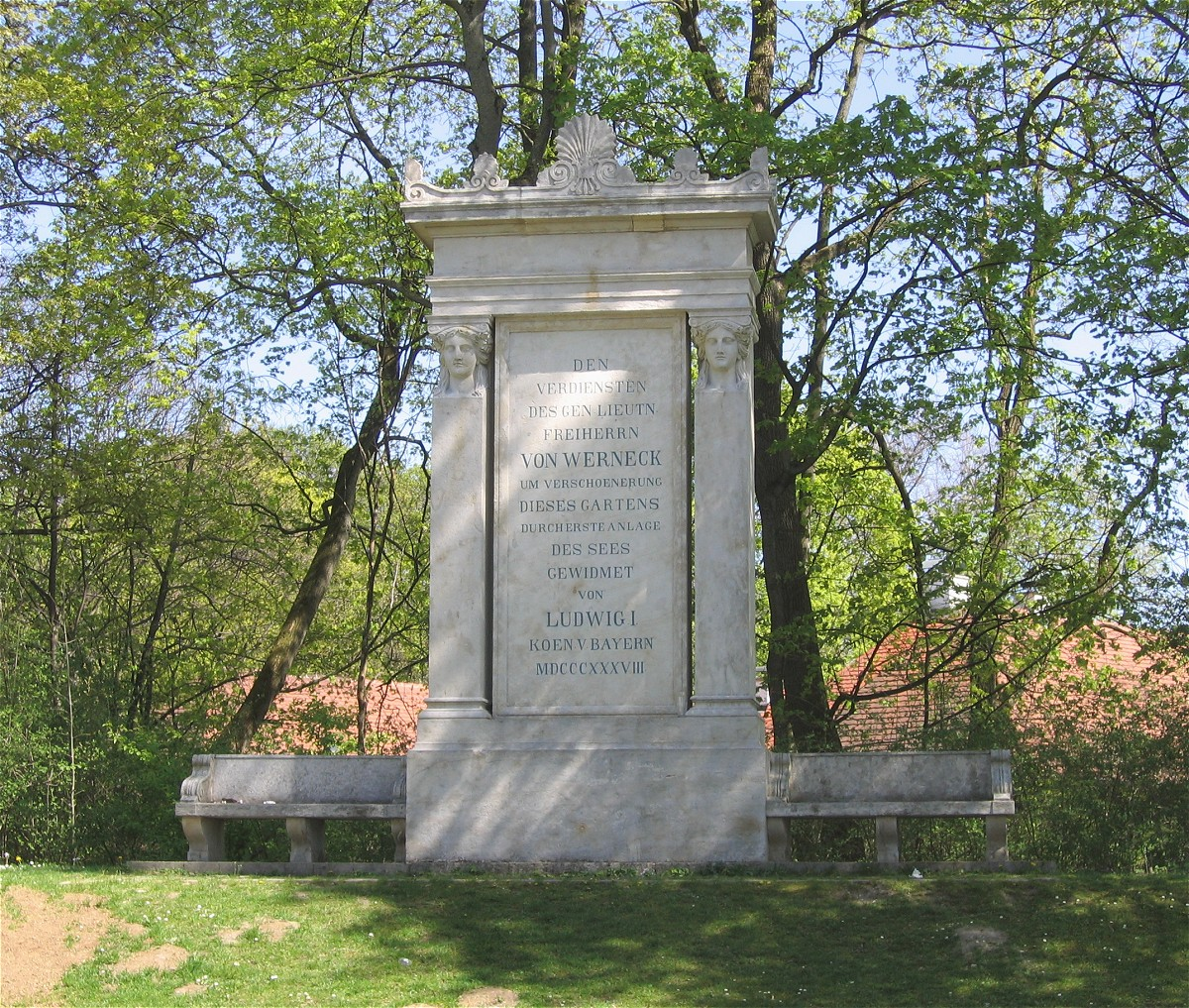
Werneck monument in the English Garden

Reinhard Freiherr von Werneck (28 June 1757 – 27 July 1842) was the successor of Benjamin Thompson in the management of the English Garden in Munich, Germany. During the six years that he held this office he was responsible for the creation of the Kleinhesseloher See and the addition of the Hirschau to the garden.

== Life ==
He was born in Ludwigsburg, the son of Franz Friedrich Freiherr von Werneck and his wife Marianne Dorothea, born von Mentzingen. He served briefly in the Austrian army, then turned to farming, before joining the Bavarian army as a colonel (Oberst) in the infantry in 1797. In November 1798, he was given the direction of the English Garden in Munich "to fill out his free hours" (German: "zur Ausfüllung seiner Mußestunden"); and this responsibility was made his main duty in March 1799, with the guidance of Friedrich Ludwig von Sckell, who had general responsibility for garden construction in Bavaria and Rheinland Pfalz. At his own cost Werneck travelled to Bohemia and Saxony to prepare himself for his duties. He hoped to make the English Garden self-supporting or even profitable by means of farming and mills (a sawmill and a grainmill were built in 1798), almost doubling the area of the garden for the purpose, through the addition of a stretch of ground to the north of the original garden.

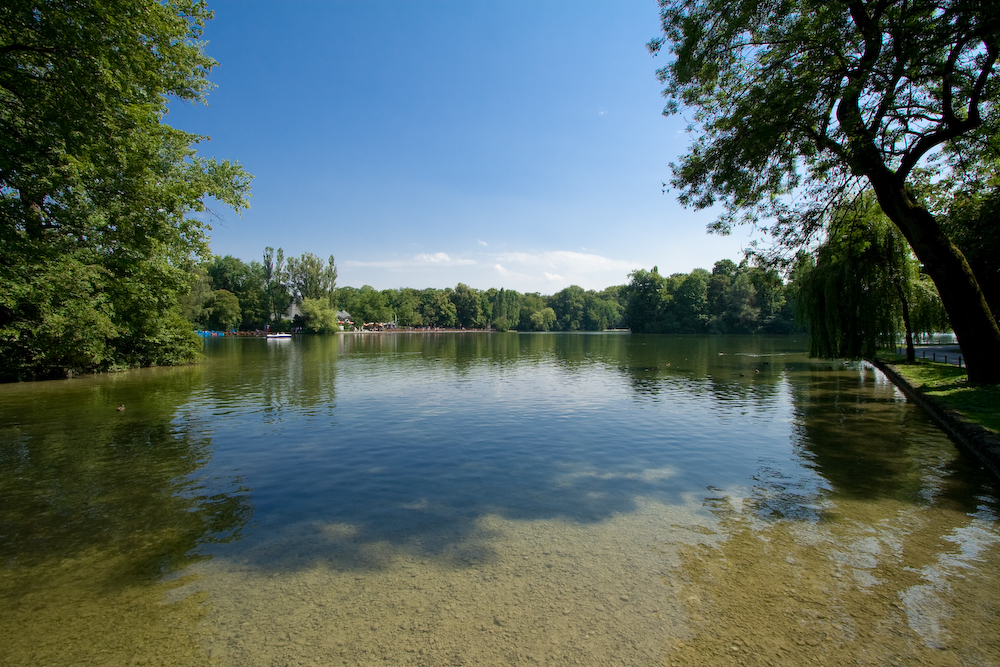
Kleinhesseloher See, created around 1800 under von Werneck's management

One improvement of the garden was not inspired by business considerations: around 1800 a new lake was created at the northern end of the original garden, the Kleinhesseloher See. Kleinhesselohe, after which it was named, was a small collection of buildings at the original northern entrance to the park, where beer, milk and cold food was served. Werneck's lake was smaller than the modern one; his successor Sckell increased its area considerably in 1812.

The newly acquired ground, the Hirschau, was of low agricultural quality; and Werneck set his soldiers to improving it in 1800 to 1802. These improvements had been expensive; and when Werneck sought money to cover the debts incurred and to buy more livestock for the garden, the request was refused. In order to finance the garden, he was driven to himself buy the concession to the mills, when no other buyer could be found at the price demanded of 5000 florins. In addition, he had made an enemy of Professor Anton Will, director of the veterinary school, which Thompson had created along with the English Garden. Insulting language from Werneck – as, for instance, that he shat on Will's demands – led Will to complain at court. In 1804 Maximilian IV Joseph gave Sckell direct charge of the English Garden and removed Werneck, with assurances of "complete satisfaction" ("allerhöchster Zufriedenheit") with his work. Werneck was disappointed: "I am losing the English Garden, working on which made my life agreeable; I had sought nothing, asked for nothing, and I lose the only thing that gave me pleasure."

As consolation, he was promoted to major general (Generalmajor) and given charge of the corps of cadets, in which children destined to become officers were instructed. He held this post until his retirement on account of ill health in 1817. In 1818 he settled in Schloss Triesdorf in Ansbach. He survived for many years and was still living in 1838, when Ludwig I honoured his contributions to the English Garden with a monument, designed by Leo von Klenze near the banks of the Kleinhesseloher See. He died on July 27, 1842, at the age of 85 in Tegernsee.

== Bibliography ==
- Theodor Dombart, Der Englische Garten zu München. Munich: Hornung, 1972. ISBN 3-87364-023-6
- Sabine Heym, "Reinhard Freiherr von Werneck (1757-1842)", 26-29 in P. von Freyberg (ed.) Der Englische Garten in München. München: Knürr, 2000. ISBN 3-928432-29-X
