= Frankfurter Ring =

Street in Munich, Germany

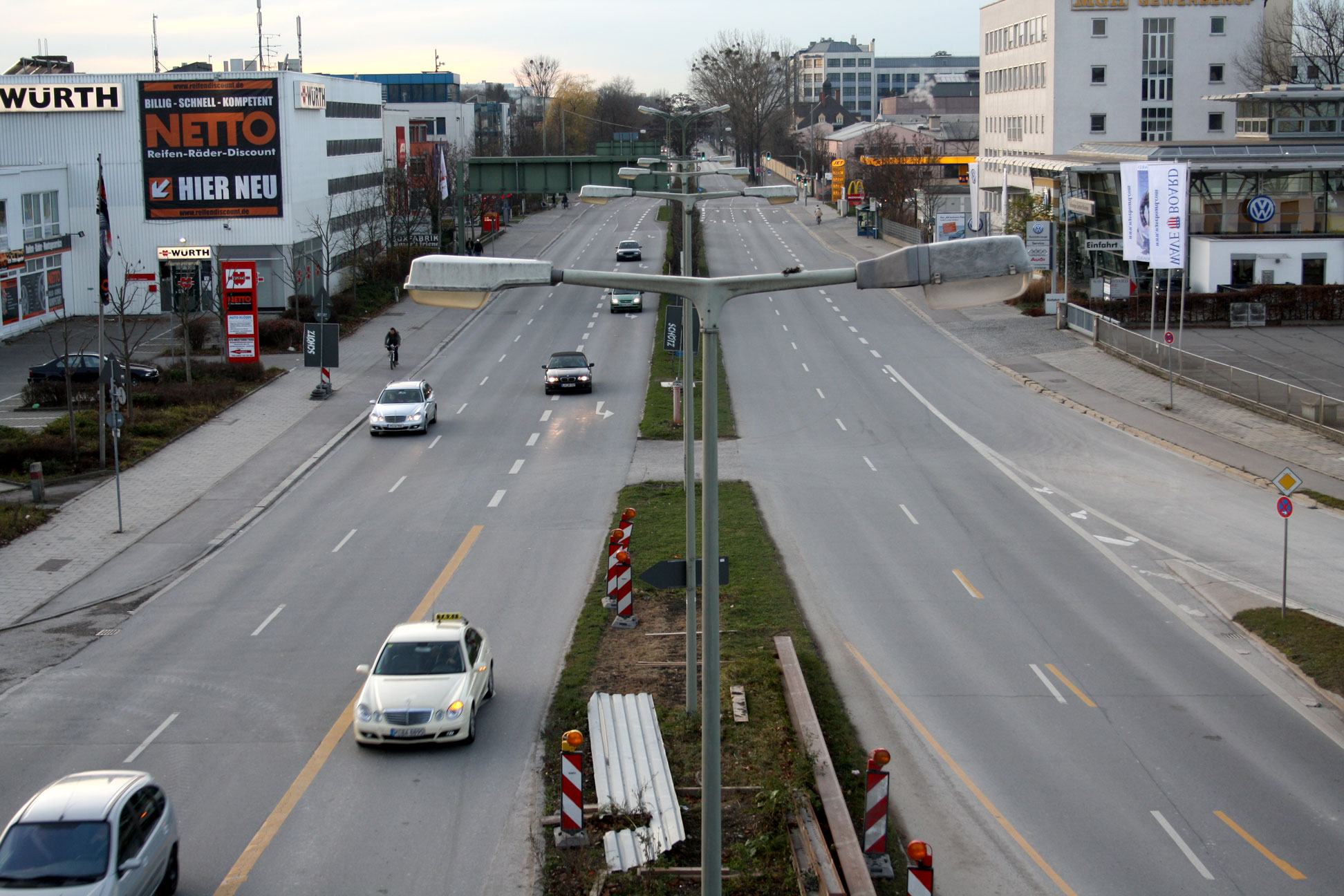
Frankfurter Ring

The Frankfurter Ring is an approximately 2.5 kilometres (1.6 mi) long street in the districts Milbertshofen and Freimann of Munich, Germany.

It is connected to Moosacher Straße (west) and Föhringer Ring (east). The subway station of the same name Frankfurter Ring is next to it.

The street is named after the city of Frankfurt.
