= Englischer Garten =

Public park in Munich

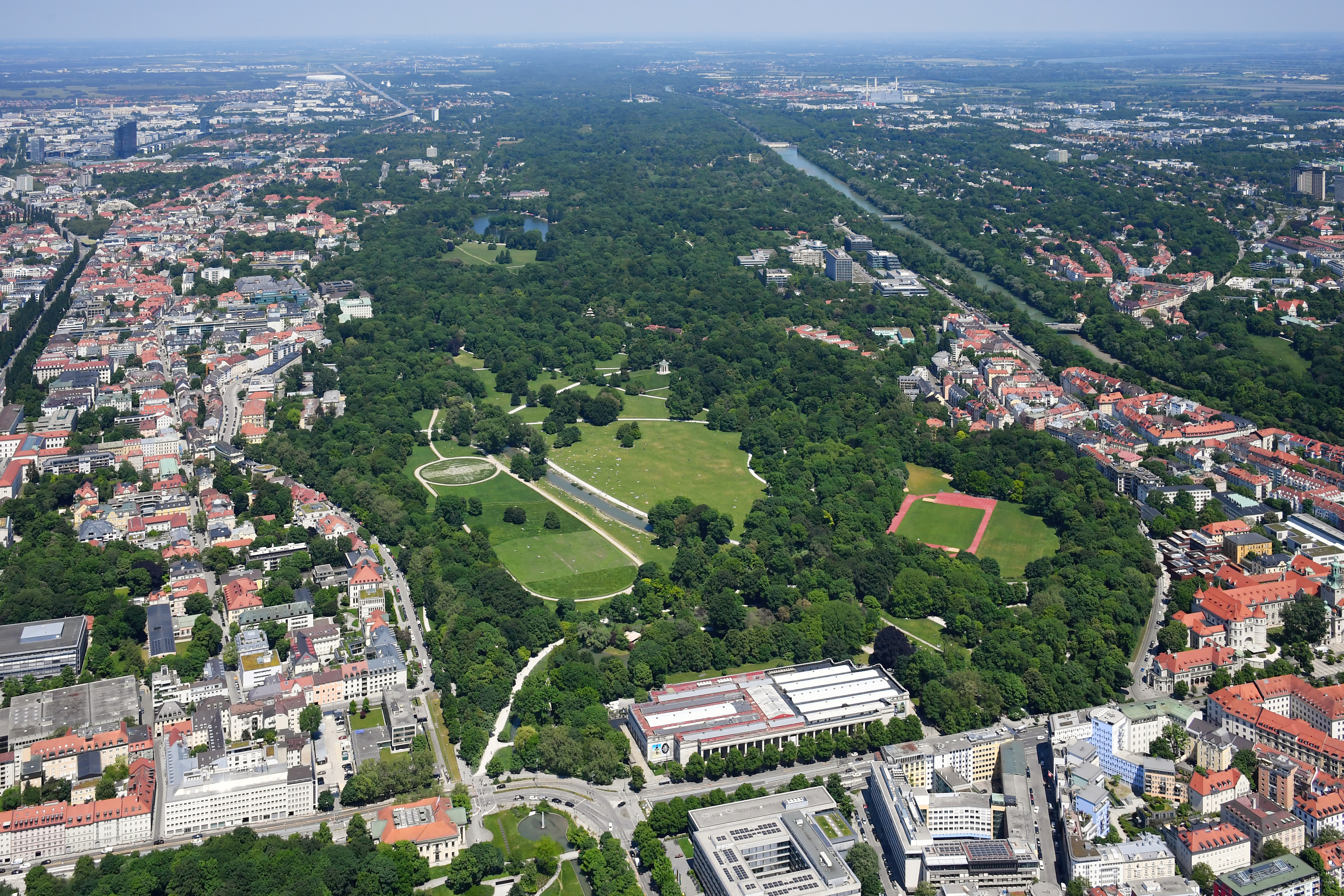
- Aerial view of the Englischer Garten
- Interactive map of Englischer Garten
- Type: Urban park
- Location: Munich, Bavaria, Germany
- Area: 3.7 km^{2} (1.4 sq mi)
- Created: 1789
- Operator: Bayerische Verwaltung der staatlichen Schlösser, Gärten und Seen
- Status: Open year round

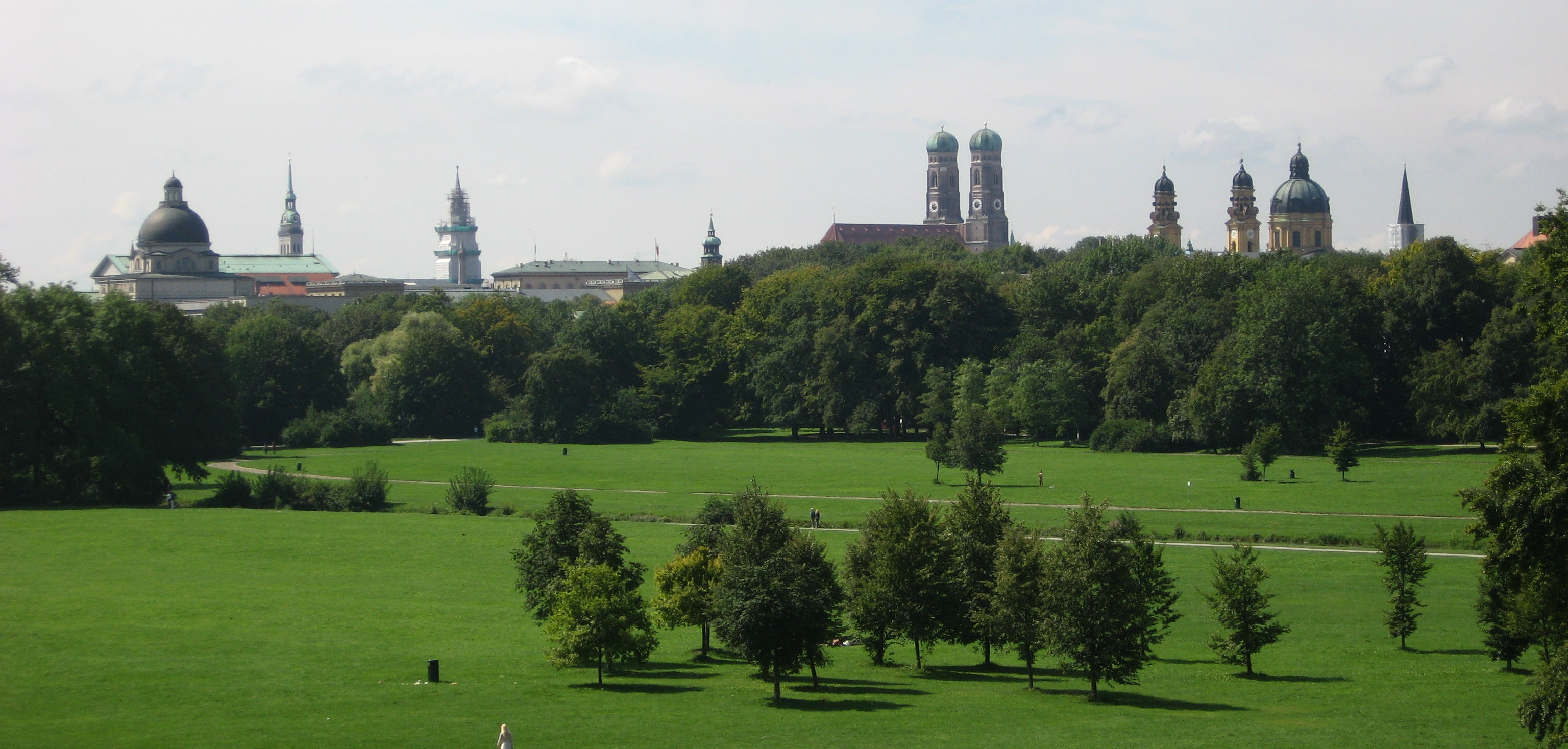
Englischer Garten with Munich skyline

The Englischer Garten (German: [ˈɛŋlɪʃɐ ˈɡaʁtn̩], lit. 'English Garden') is a large public park in the centre of Munich, Bavaria, stretching from the city centre to the northeastern city limits. The creation began in 1789, supervised by Sir Benjamin Thompson (1753–1814), later Count Rumford (Reichsgraf von Rumford), for Prince Charles Theodore, Elector of Bavaria. Thompson's successors, Reinhard von Werneck (1757–1842) and Friedrich Ludwig von Sckell (1750–1823), advisers on the project from its beginning, both extended and improved the park.

With an area of 3.7 km^{2} (1.4 sq mi, 370 ha or 910 acres), the Englischer Garten is one of the world's largest urban public parks. The name refers to its English garden form of informal landscape, a style popular in England from the mid-18th century to the early 19th century and particularly associated with Capability Brown.

== History ==
=== Creation ===
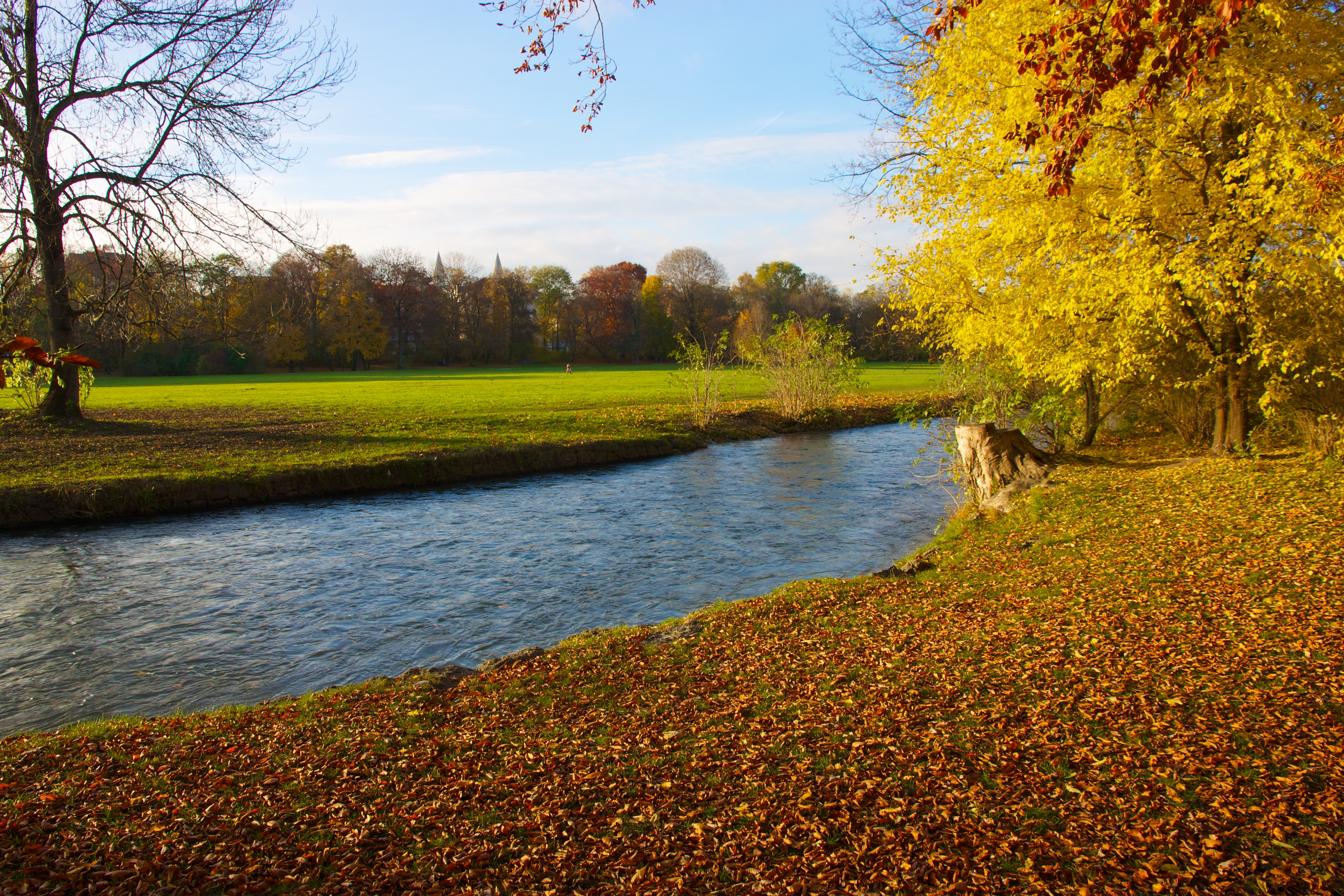
Autumn foliage in the Englischer Garten

When the Elector of Bavaria Maximilian III Joseph, the last ruler from the Bavarian branch of the Wittelsbach dynasty, died childless in 1777, his throne passed to Charles Theodore, count and elector of the Palatinate. The new ruler preferred his existing home in Mannheim on the Rhine to living in Bavaria and tried unsuccessfully to trade his unloved inheritance for the Austrian Netherlands. Understandably, the people of Munich returned his disdain. To offset this unhappy atmosphere, Charles Theodore devoted much attention to improvements in the city. Among others, he created an art gallery in the northern arcades of the Residence's Hofgarten ("Court Garden") and made both the garden and the new gallery open to the public (the former in 1780, the latter in 1781).

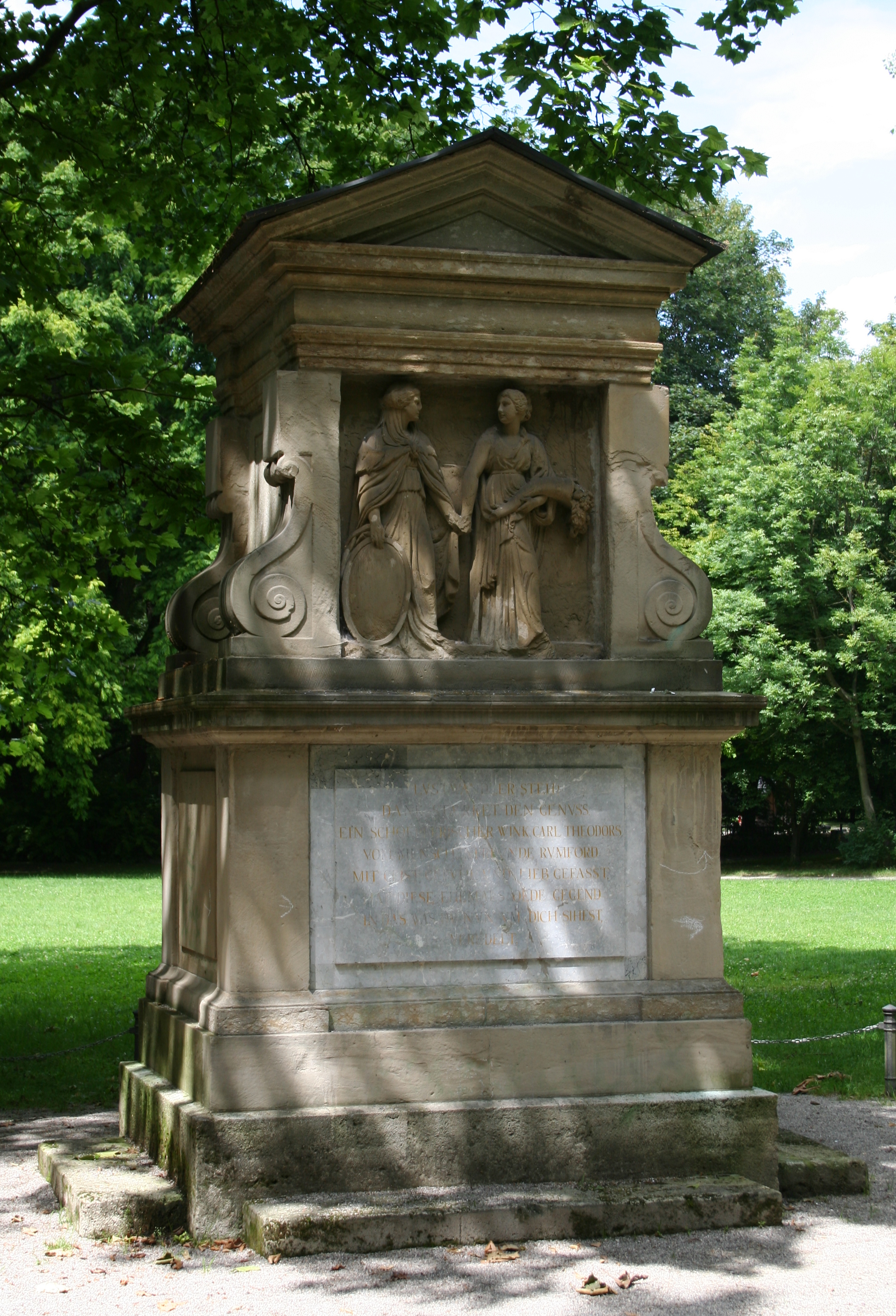
The Rumford Monument in the park honours Sir Benjamin Thompson's contribution

While the Hofgarten was then the only public park in Munich, that was not the primary motivation for the creation of the Englischer Garten. Rather, it was part of a series of military reforms being pursued under the guidance of Sir Benjamin Thompson, the new Elector's chief military aide, later created Count Rumford and appointed as Bavarian war minister. Born in Massachusetts, Thompson had served on the Loyalist side in the American Revolutionary War, and after the British defeat had returned to England before moving to continental Europe and entering Charles Theodore's service in 1784. In 1788 Thompson proposed that in peacetime the majority of the soldiers of the Elector's army should be given leave to do civilian work, such as farming and gardening. In February 1789, Charles Theodore decreed that military gardens should be laid out in each garrison city, to provide soldiers with good agricultural knowledge and also to serve as recreation areas, accessible also to the public.

The planned location of the Munich gardens was the area north of the Schwabinger city gate, a hunting ground of the Wittelsbach rulers since the Middle Ages. Known as the Hirschanger (or "deer park"), the higher part of the hunting ground closer to the city was included in the scheme, while the Hirschau (also meaning "deer park"), lower and further north, and a more densely wooded part to the south known as the Hirschangerwald ("Deer Park Wood") were originally not included. The whole area had been subject to flooding from the Isar, the river on which Munich stands, a little to the east. This problem was soon removed by the construction of a river wall in 1790, which became known as the "Riedl-Damm" after the engineer Anton von Riedl, who had supervised its construction.

The laying out of the military garden was begun in July 1789, and an area of 800 by slightly less than 200 metres was quickly made ready for cultivation, but soon the idea was extended to the creation of a public park, of which the military garden should be only a small part. On August 13, 1789, Charles Theodore published a decree, devoting the Hirschanger to the amusement of the people of Munich. To advise on the project, the Royal Gardener Friedrich Ludwig Sckell (ennobled in 1808) who had studied landscape gardening in England and had previously worked for Charles Theodore at Schwetzingen, had been summoned to Munich earlier in August. Various associated projects were made part of the park development, among them the Elevengarten ("Pupils' Garden", a garden for the students at the recently formed military academy), a "Schweizerey" (cattle farm), "Schäfery" (sheep farm) and "Ackerbauschule" (arable farming school) to improve farming techniques, and a "Vihearzneyschule" (veterinary school) for the treatment of cattle diseases. Most of these projects did not long survive the creation of the park, but the veterinary school went on to become what is now the Tierärztliche Fakultät (Veterinary Faculty) of LMU Munich. The gateway from 1790 can be seen at the Veterinärstraße entrance to the garden. The park was initially named "Theodors Park", but it very quickly became known by the descriptive name of "the English Garden". By May 1790 sufficient progress had been made to allow Charles Theodore to make an inspection tour; but it was first in the spring of 1792 that the park was officially opened to the approximately 40,000 citizens of Munich.

=== Further development ===
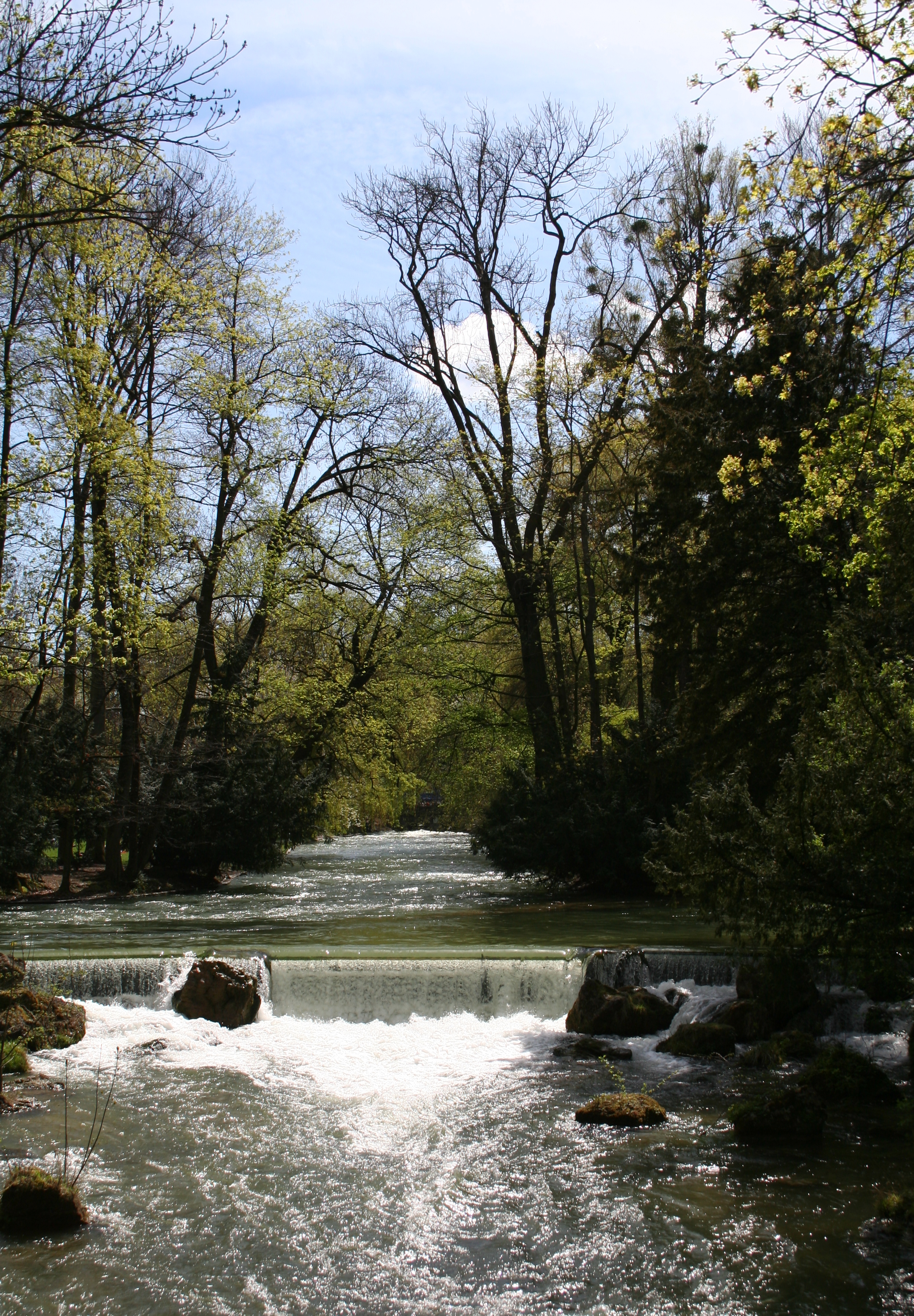
The waterfall created in 1815

Thompson left Munich in 1798. His successor, Baron von Werneck, attempted to make the garden itself through its agricultural use. To that end he expanded the park in December 1799 to encompass the Hirschau, which was improved to provide pasture. The fields of the military gardens were added to the Englischer Garten in January 1800. Werneck's improvements had been costly, and in 1804 he was replaced by Sckell, who was given the post of Bayerischer Hofgärtenintendant ("Bavarian Court Garden Supervisor"). Although Sckell had had a guiding role from the beginning, many aspects of the execution differed from his ideas, which he set out in a memorandum of 1807. His long supervision of the garden (1804–1823) was marked by a movement away from agricultural uses and by concentration on the landscape garden. For instance, two mills at the point where the Schwabingerbach (Schwabing stream) leaves the Eisbach (Ice stream) were removed and an artificial waterfall was created in 1814–1815.

Under Sckell, the park took on its present form. The only significant addition since his time is the creation of the hill for the Monopteros by his nephew Carl August Sckell, who succeeded him as director of the park. In the 20th century, there were some minor additions to the park, most notably the addition in 1952 of some thirty hectares of land where the locomotive factory of Joseph Anton von Maffei had stood, and in 1958–1962 of a further 67 hectares from the Hirschauer Forst (Hirschau Wood). The century almost brought less welcome changes to the park. In the Second World War, Allied bombing damaged the Monopteros and destroyed the Chinese Tower, and 93,000 cubic metres of rubble were dumped in the Hirschanger. The area was only cleared in 1953, when a sports ground for schools was created there. (The park briefly had another sports ground, with the archery range that hosted the archery competitions for the 1972 Summer Olympics on the Werneckwiese by the Kleinhesseloher See.) Transport too has harmed the character of the garden, most notably with the construction in 1963 of the Isarring, part of Munich's central ring road, which divides the park just north of the Kleinhesseloher See. Towards the end of the 20th century the city of Munich wished to construct a tram route through the garden north of the Chinese Tower, currently a road used only by buses; but it was opposed by the Bavarian government, which owns the land, and the Bayerische Verwaltungsgerichtshof rejected the plan. There were also natural disasters: many trees were destroyed by severe storms in 1964, 1988, and 1990 (the "Wiebke" storm); and Dutch elm disease has almost destroyed the elm trees of the park. Both kinds of loss were compensated by a "tree donation" campaign organised by Munich's Abendzeitung ("Evening Paper") in 1989 to 1990 on the occasion of the park's 200th anniversary; among the 1500 new trees that were planted were a thousand elms, using only varieties resistant to Dutch elm disease.

== Sights and attractions ==
=== Japanese teahouse ===
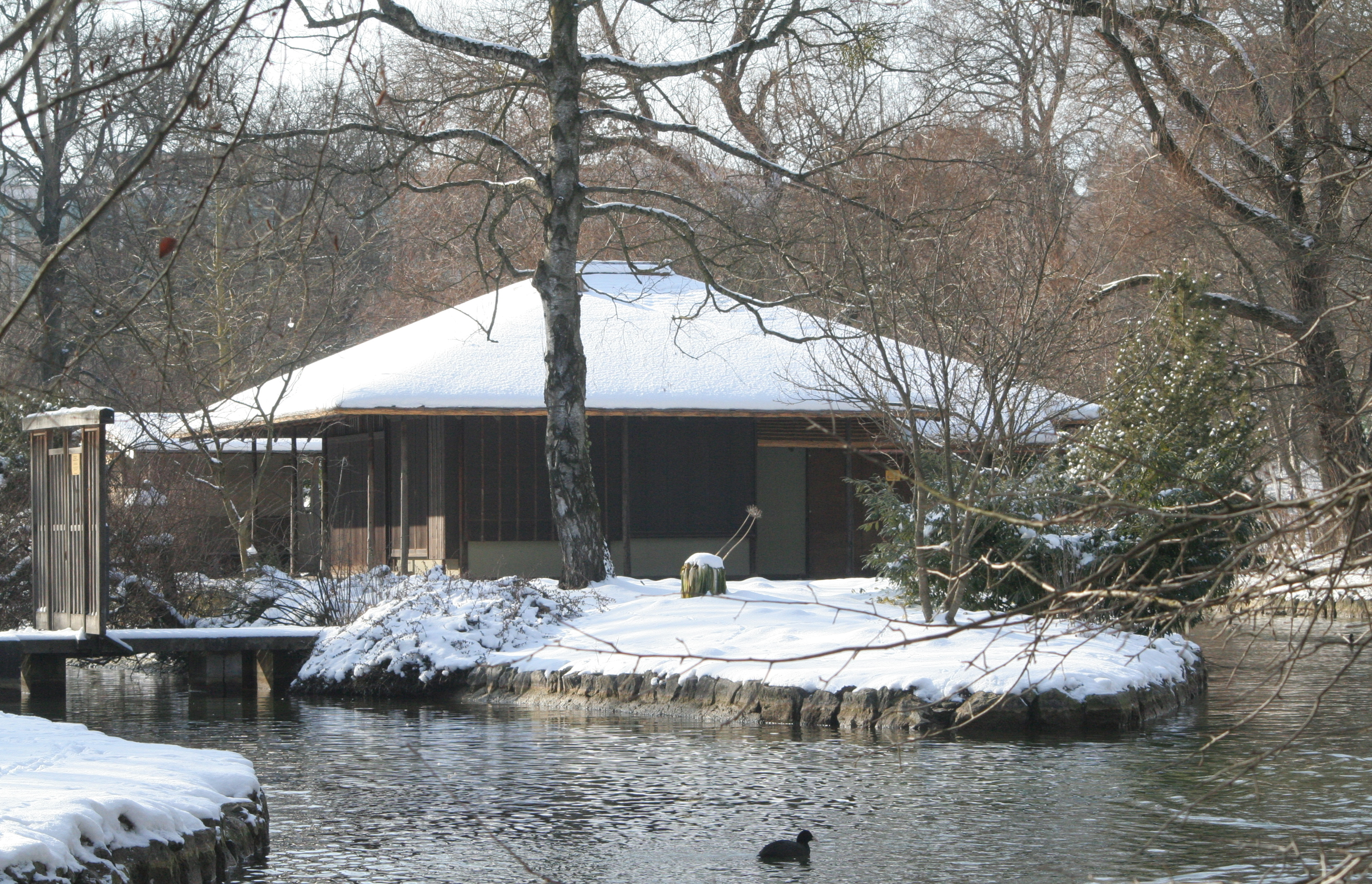
The Japanese teahouse in winter

In April 1972, to celebrate the Summer Olympics of that year, held in Munich, a Japanese teahouse and a Japanese garden were created on a small island at the south end of the Englischer Garten, behind the Haus der Kunst. The island lies in a lake which had been created only a few years earlier, in 1969. The teahouse was a gift to Bavaria from Soshitsu Sen, head of the Urasenke tea school in Kyoto, and it was designed by Soshitsu Sen and Mitsuo Nomura. A traditional Japanese tea ceremony takes place here regularly.

=== Schönfeldwiese and surroundings ===
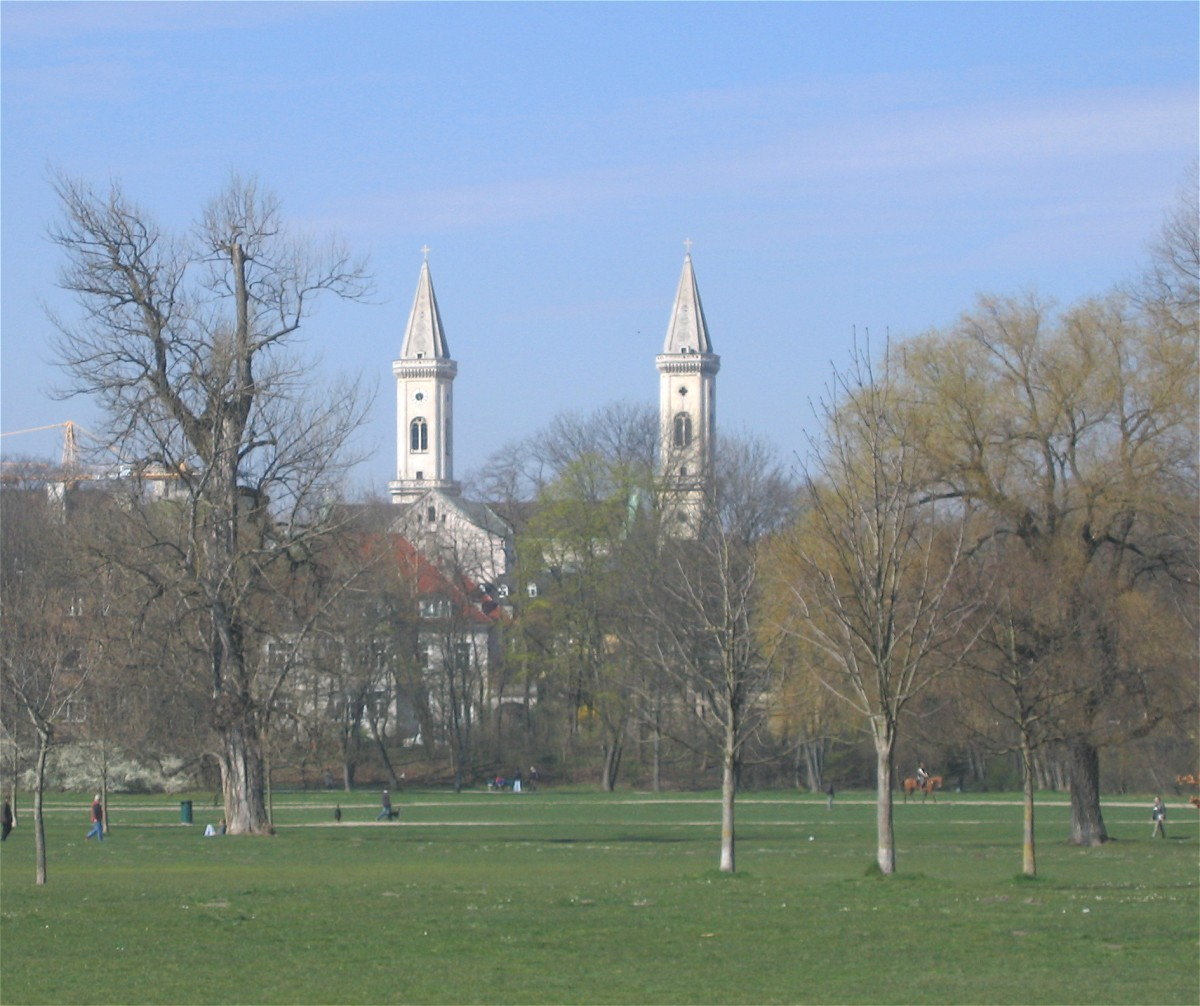
Northern Schönfeldwiese, looking towards the Ludwigskirche

Between the Monopteros and the Japanisches Teehaus lies the Schönfeldwiese ("Beautiful field meadow"). In this part of the Gardens nude sunbathing has been permitted since the 1960s, something which many Germans practise. It caused quite a sensation at the time and also made the English Gardens well-known, even outside Munich. The Schönfeldwiese proper lies to the south of the Schwabingerbach, which crosses the Englischer Garten at this point before flowing northwards along its west side; but the name is sometimes used of the whole larger open space. The expanse to the north of the Schwabingerbach, the Carl Theodorswiese ("Carl Theodor's meadow") has the oldest construction in the park: the "Burgfriedsäule", a boundary marker from 1724, topped with the Münchner Kindl stands in a grove of trees below the Monopteros.

=== Surfing ===
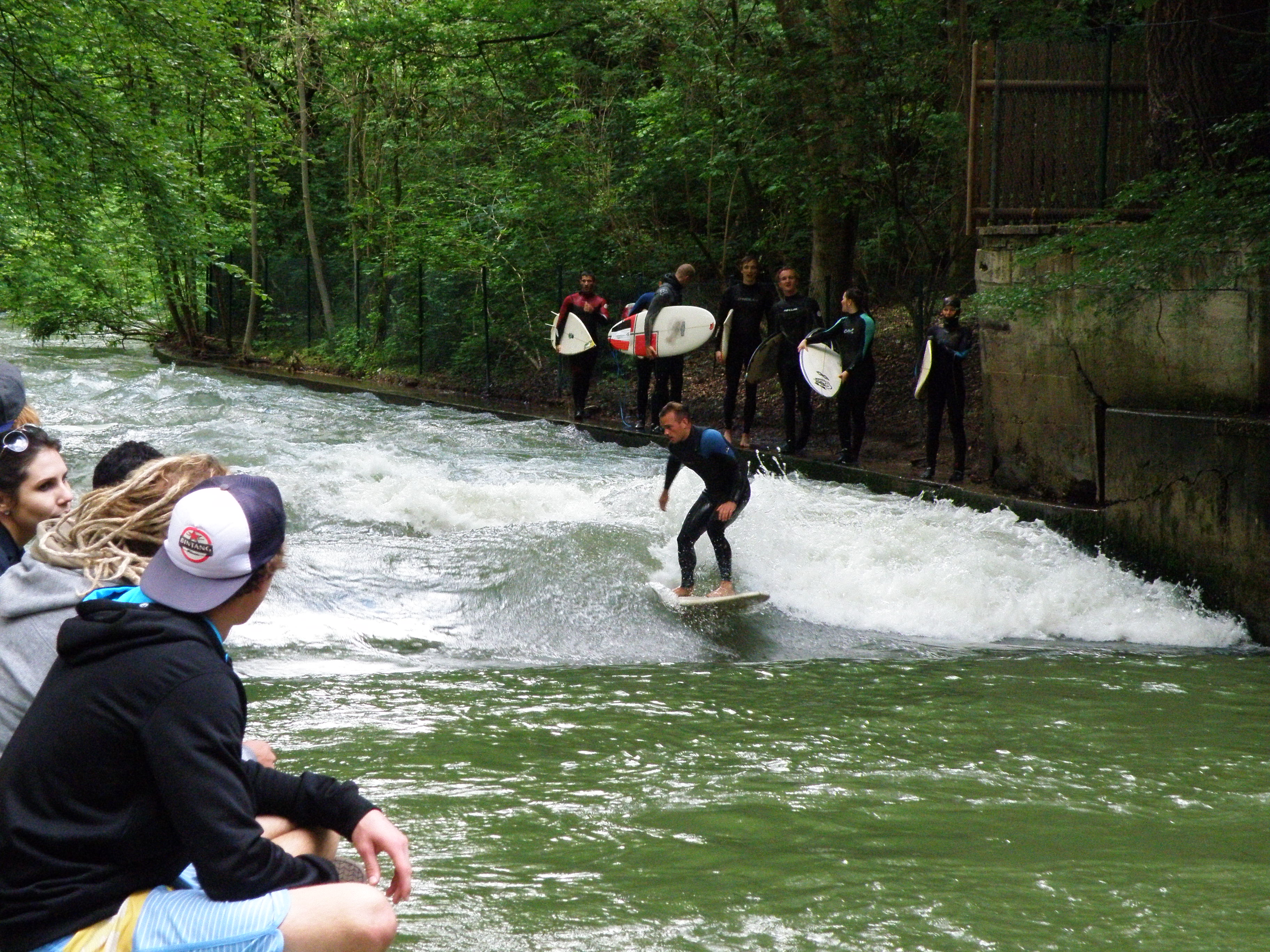
A surfer riding a wave in a stream in the Garden

In one of the artificial streams flowing through the Englischer Garten, there is a standing wave (a stationary hydraulic jump) in which there is a transition from laminar to turbulent flow. Surfers line up along the bank taking turns entering the water with their boards. After a minute or so, successful surfers will voluntarily drop out returning to the end of the line allowing the next person in line an opportunity. The signage states that surfing should only be done by expert or skilled surfers.

=== Monopteros ===
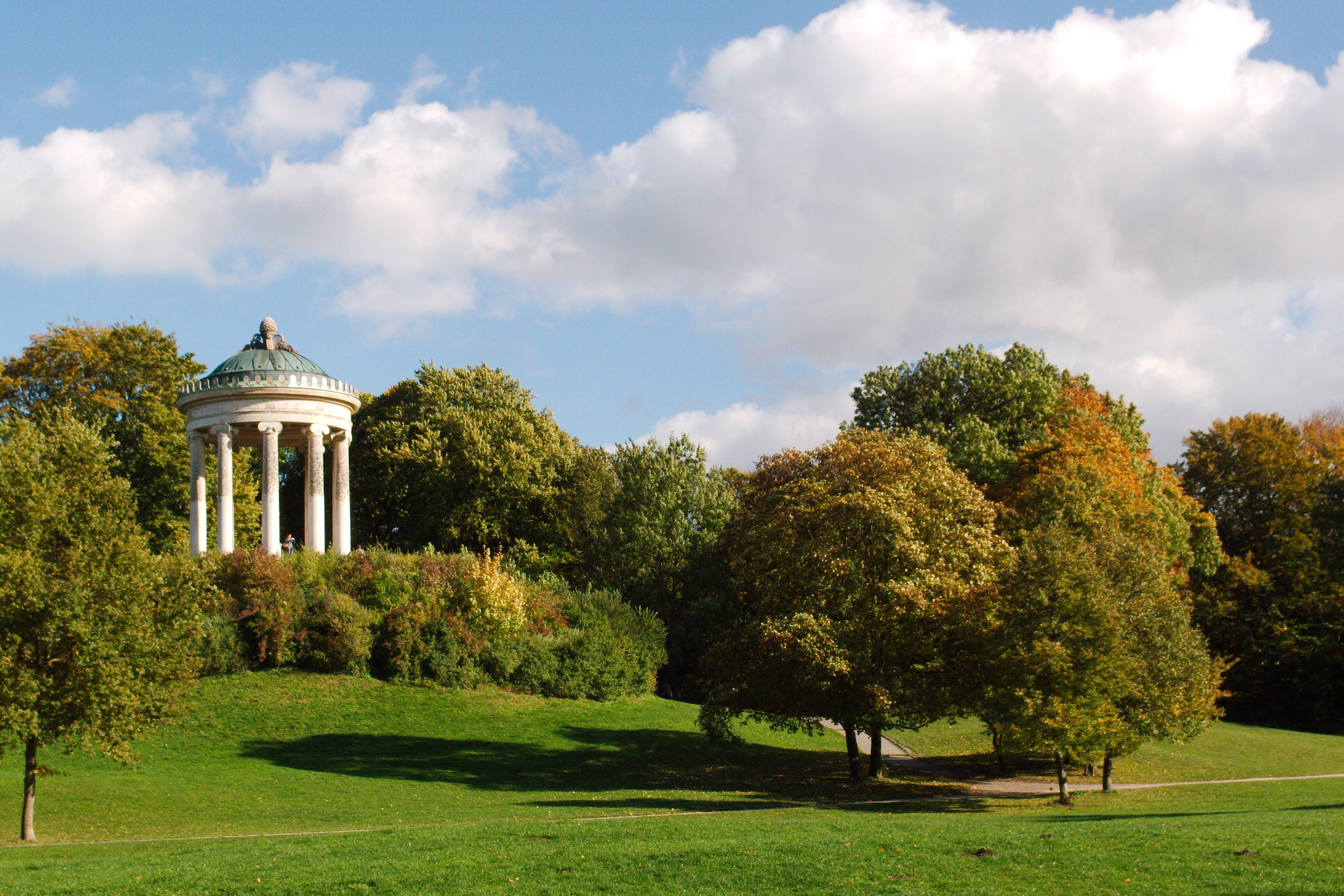
The Monopteros

When the nearby wooden Apollo temple had fallen into disrepair, an early idea of Sckell's for a hilltop temple was taken up and a new stone building of similar design was commissioned (an early plan even calls the Monopteros "Apollo Tempel", a name it never actually bore). This small (16 m high), round, Greek-style temple was designed by Leo von Klenze. It was built on a 15 m high foundation, around which a small hill was created in 1832, using leftover building material from recent work on the Munich Residenz (Royal Residence). Hill and temple were completed in 1836. Ten Ionic columns support a shallow copper-covered dome; palmettes adorn the sima. A particular feature of the Monopteros is the use of polychrome stone painting, an interest of Klenze at the time, who intended the building to serve as a model for its use.

=== Steinerne Bank ===
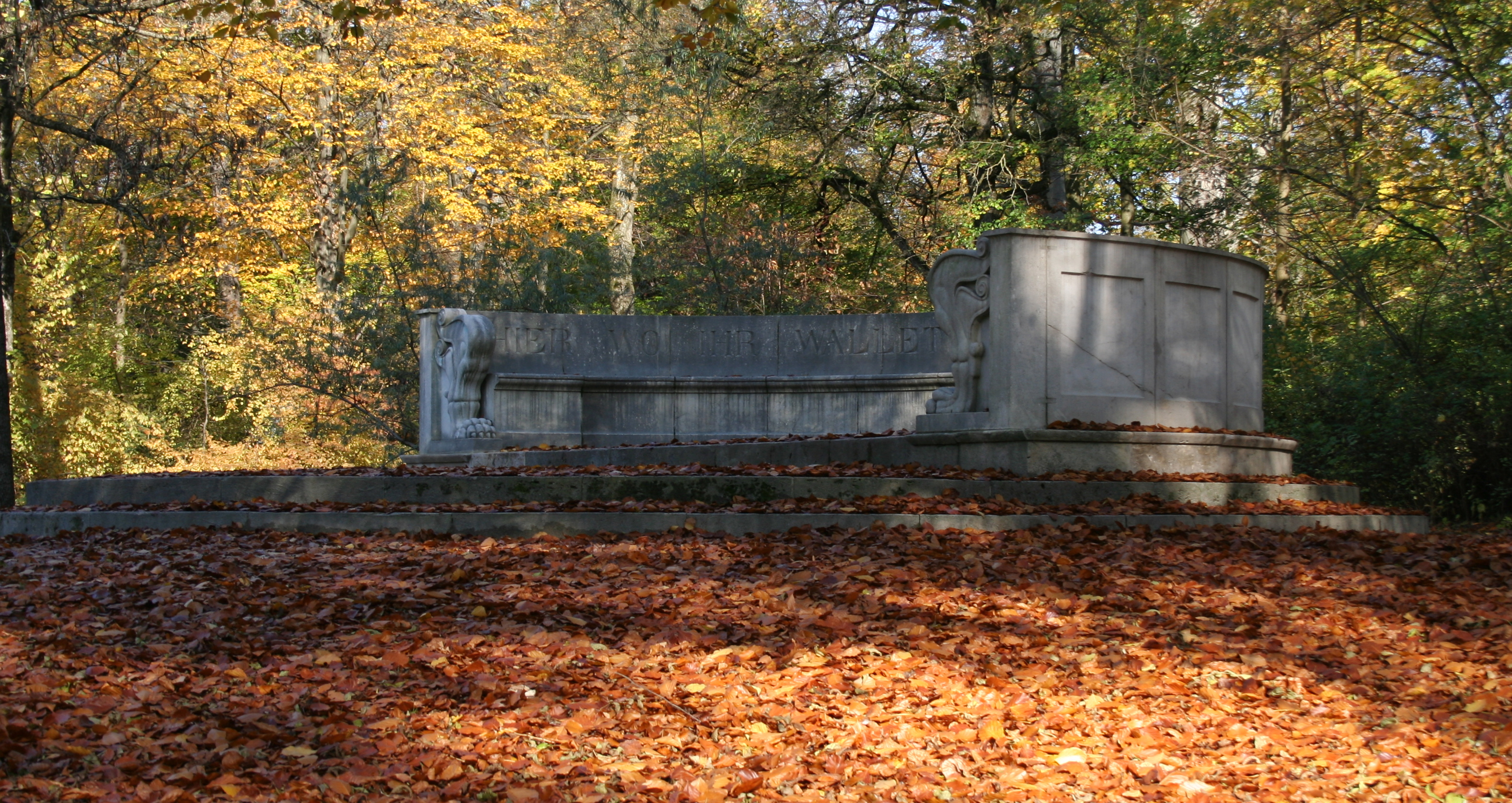
Klenze's Steinerne Bank

Before the Monopteros was built, a small circular temple had stood by the Eisbach a little to the south of the Chinesischer Turm. Designed by Johann Baptist Lechner (1758–1809) and erected in 1789, it became known as the Apollo temple after an Apollo statue by Josef Nepomuk Muxel was added to it in 1791. While the basis of the temple was tuff, the temple itself was wooden; and by the early nineteenth century, this had fallen into disrepair. In 1838, Leo von Klenze built an exedra or stone bench (Steinerne Bank) in place of the temple, with the inscription "Hier wo Ihr wallet, da war sonst Wald nur und Sumpf" ("Here where you meander was once only wood and marsh"). The temple's circular basis served as the basis for the curved bench.

=== Chinese Tower ===
==== Tower ====
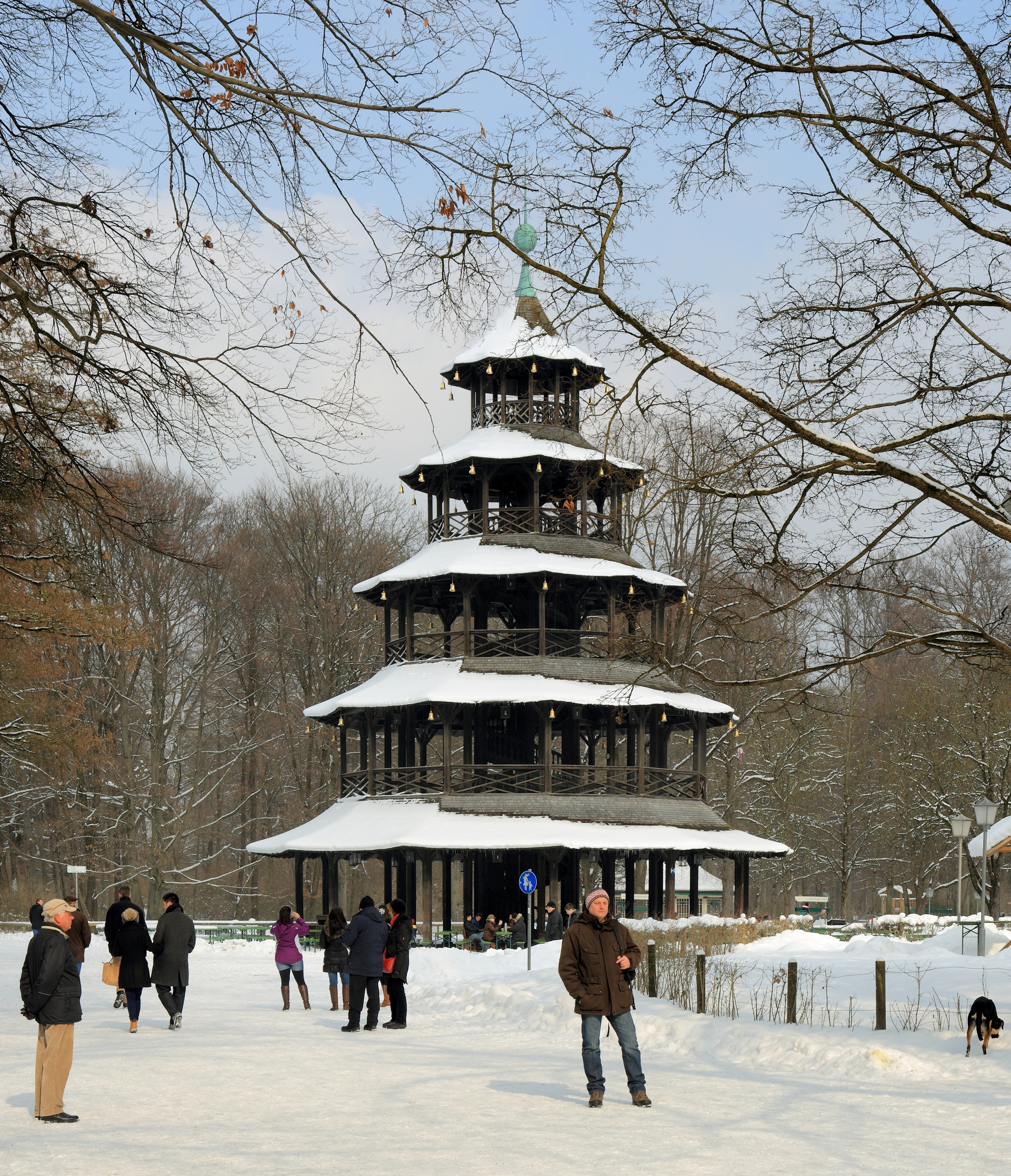
The Chinese Tower in winter

The Chinesischer Turm ("Chinese Tower") is a 25-metre-high wooden structure, first constructed in 1789 to 1790, from a design by the Mannheimer military architect Joseph Frey (1758–1819). It was modelled on the "Great Pagoda" in the Royal Botanic Gardens in Kew. The Pagoda, twice as high as the tower, was supposed to resemble a porcelain pagoda in the gardens of a Chinese emperor. The Munich tower has five storeys: the ground storey roof has a diameter of 19 m, the topmost storey of 6 m.

On July 13, 1944, the original tower burned down after heavy bombing; but a society aiming to rebuild it was formed in 1951 and the new tower, copied accurately from the original by consulting photographs and old drawings, was completed in September 1952.

==== Surroundings ====
A wooden Chinesische Wirtschaft (restaurant in Chinese style), designed by Lechner, was added in 1790. In 1912, this was replaced by the present-day stone building, which reflected the original design. With 7,000 seats, the beer garden at the Chinesischer Turm is the second largest in Munich.

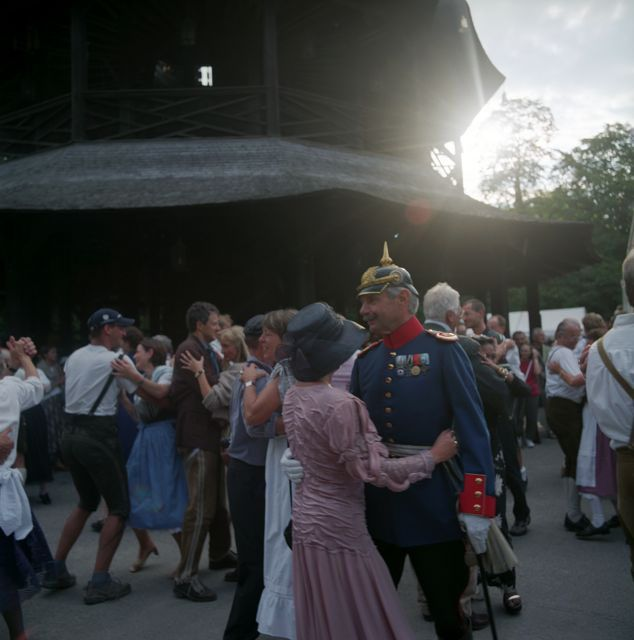
"Kocherlball" (cooks' ball) at the Chinese Tower, 2001

In the late 19th century up to 5000 servants, manual workers, soldiers, and students would come to the tower early on a Sunday morning to dance to the music of a brass band. The dance began around five in the morning and ended around eight o'clock, so that servants could return to serve their employers' breakfast or go to church. As a dance for servants it was known as the "Kocherlball" (cooks' ball). In 1904 the custom was forbidden by the police on moral grounds. But in 1989, to celebrate the two hundredth anniversary of the park, a revival was made, with around 4000 attending, and the dance has since been celebrated each year in July.

A children's carousel was put up near the tower in 1823, similar in design to the current one. By 1912 a replacement was needed, which is still in use. It was designed by the Schwabinger sculptor Joseph Erlacher and the decoration painter August Julier. Alongside the usual horses, the carousel has less expected creatures to ride, such as an ibex, stork and flamingo. Its wooden roof and pillars were restored from 1979 to 1980.

South of the tower are the Ökonomiegebäude ("Economy buildings"), which were designed by Lechner towards the end of the 18th century as a model farm. Today, the Ökonomiegebäude are occupied by the management of the Englischer Garten.

=== Rumford-Saal ===
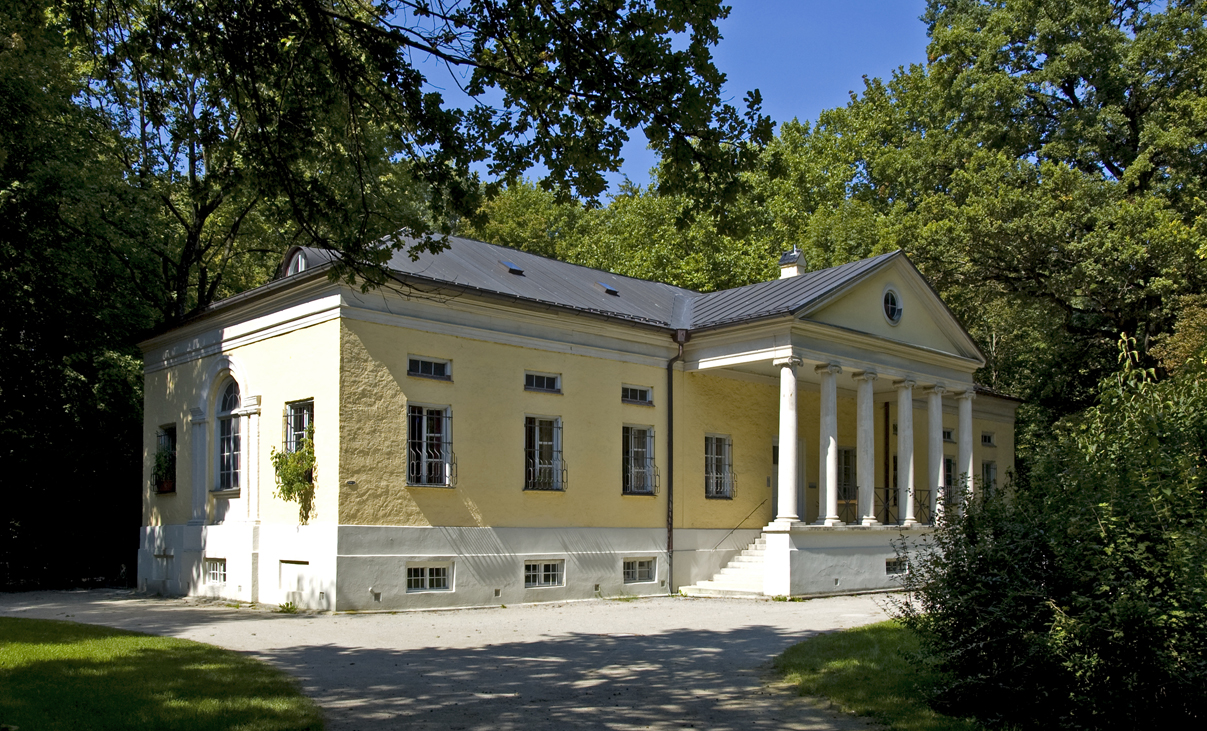
Rumford-Saal

A little to the north of the Chinesischer Turm, the Rumford-Saal (Rumford Hall) or Rumfordhaus (Rumford House) is a small building in Palladian style. During its construction it was known as the "großer Saal" (great hall) or "Militairsaal" (military hall); but it was later renamed to honour the garden's founder, Benjamin Thompson, Count Rumford. It was built in 1791 by Lechner as an officers' mess (Offiziers-kasino) and was used first by the army, later by the court. The building, 30 m long and 10 m wide, has one and a half storeys; front and back have a portico with six wooden Ionic pillars. Its dining hall, adorned with many mirrors which give it its name, the "Spiegelsaal" (mirror room), has room for 150 people. The building is currently used by the city of Munich as a children's centre ("Kinderfreizeitstätte").

=== Kleinhesseloher See ===
Kleinhesseloher See
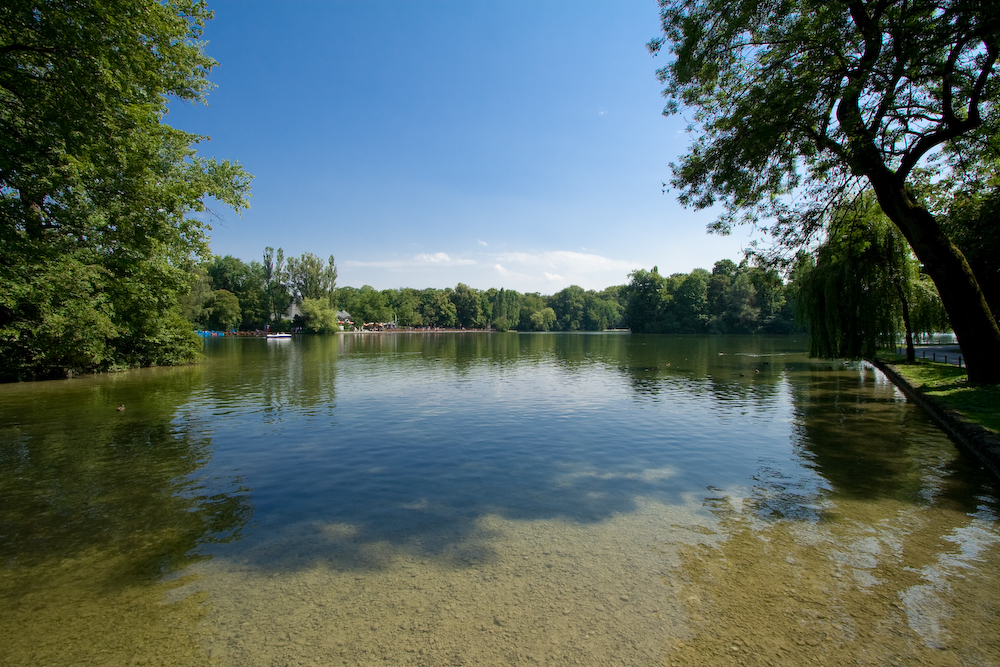

- Location within Bavaria
- Location: Englischer Garten, Munich
- Coordinates: 48°9′38″N 11°35′47″E
- Type: artificial lake
- Basin countries: Germany
- Surface area: 8.64 ha (21.3 acres)
- Islands: 3 (Königsinsel, Kurfürsteninsel, Regenteninsel)

The Kleinhesseloher See ("Kleinhesseloher Lake") was created under Werneck's direction around 1800 between the districts of Schwabing, at that time a village north of Munich, and Kleinhesselohe. Kleinhesselohe had been the original northern limit of the park, with a watchhouse and a gate to the northern Hirschau. The park warden there had set up an improvised beer shop for workers in the park. This soon expanded to offer milk and cold meals and came to be a favoured stop for walkers in the park, especially after a wooden dance place had been added. Werneck's successor Sckell increased the size of the lake by one and a half times in 1807 to 1812, giving it its present form. It is constantly fed by water from the Eisbach. Three islands can be found within the lake's 86,410 square meters: Königsinsel ("King's Island", 2,720 m^{2}), Kurfürsteninsel ("Elector's Island", 1,260 m^{2}) and Regenteninsel ("Regent's Island", 640 m^{2}).

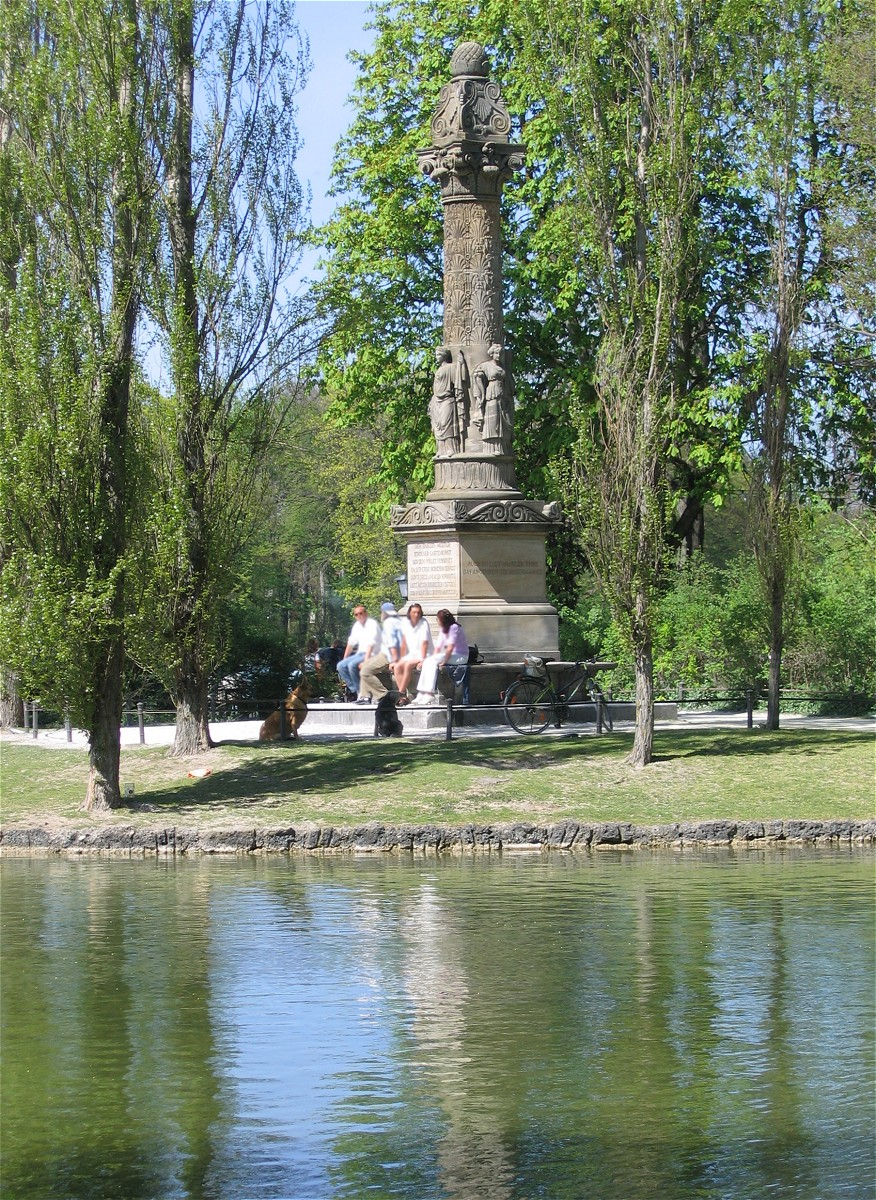
Sckell monument on the banks of the Kleinhesseloher See

Sckell's enlargement of the lake brought it close to Kleinhesselohe; and the little beer garden there was to be a forerunner of the modern Seehaus ("lake house"), with 2,500 seats. In 1882 to 1883 Gabriel von Seidel built a boathouse with food service. This was replaced with a new building by Rudolf Esterer in 1935; with a terrace overlooking the lake, this was very popular until 1970, when it was demolished. A competition for a new design was won by Alexander von Branca, with a design modelled on a Japanese village; but the work was found too costly and never executed. For fifteen years service was from temporary buildings, until in 1985 the current Seehaus was built to a design by Ernst Hürlimann and Ludwig Wiedemann. Today, the lake and the Seehaus are well-loved leisure destinations; pedal boats are also leased here to those who want to splash around.

Two monuments near the lake honour its creators. The Werneck-Denkmal, a monument to Werneck, stands on a rise near the east side. It was erected in 1838 on Ludwig I's suggestion to a design by von Klenze. A little south of it, on the bank of the lake, the Sckell-Säule ("Sckell pillar") honours Ludwig von Sckell. This, also designed by von Klenze, was erected in 1824, a year after Sckell's death; the design was executed by Ernst von Bandel, who would later be known as the creator of the Hermannsdenkmal.

=== Hirschau ===
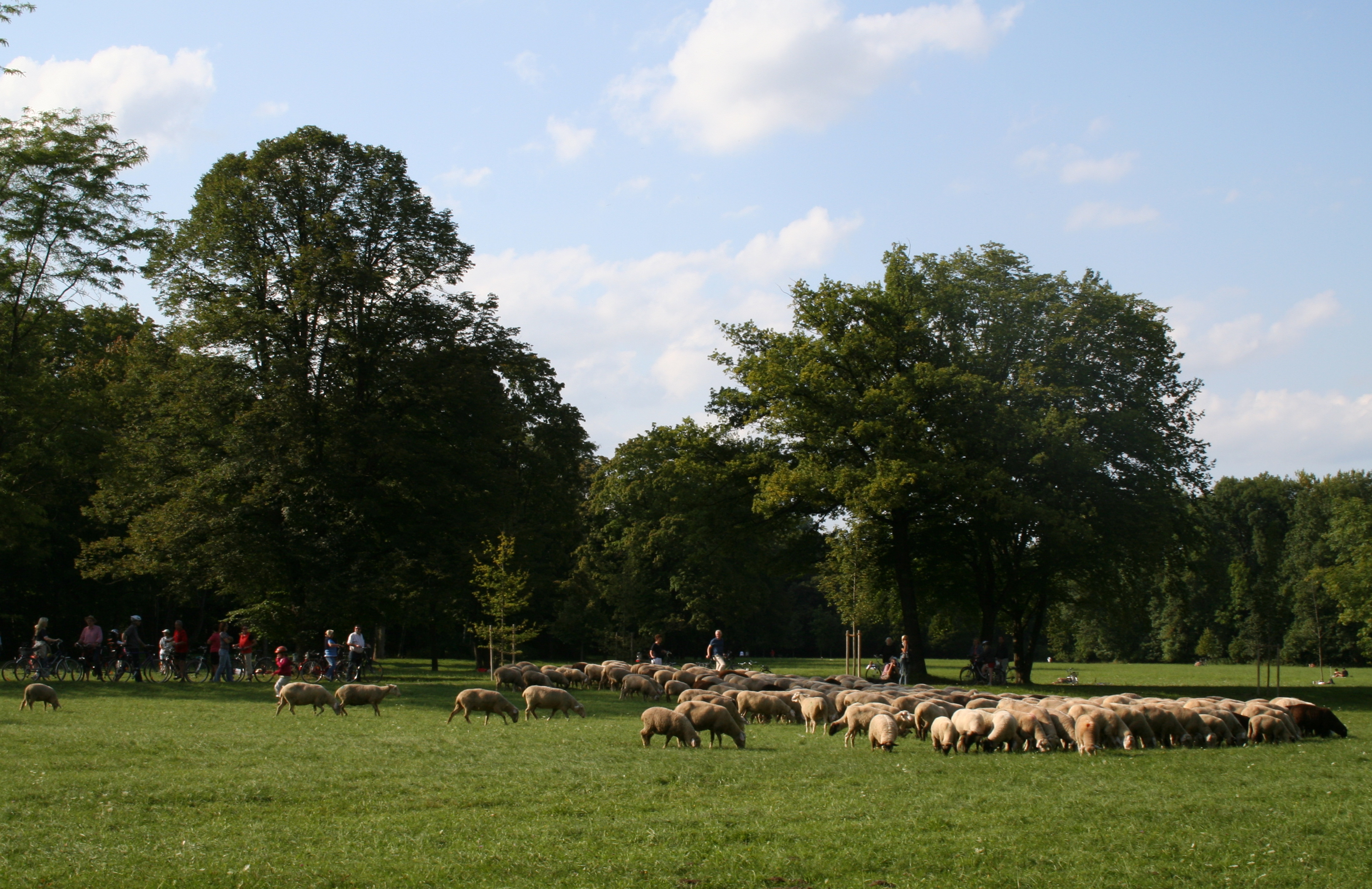
A flock of sheep in the Hirschau

The Englischer Garten is divided into two portions by the busy Isarring road. The southern part is around 2 km long, while the northern part, called the Hirschau, is around 3 km long. In contrast to the southern part, which on sunny days contains as many people as one would find in a medium-sized town, the Hirschau has a peaceful character. In the southern part the grass in the open expanses (heavily used for sport and sunbathing) must be kept short; but in the Hirschau some meadows are allowed to grow and are mown for hay in June and August, while others are used as pasture for sheep. Two beer gardens, the "Aumeister", built in 1810–11 by the court mason (Hofmaurermeister) Joseph Deiglmayr (1760–1814) and the "Hirschau", built in 1840, are located at the north and south end of the Hirschau respectively.

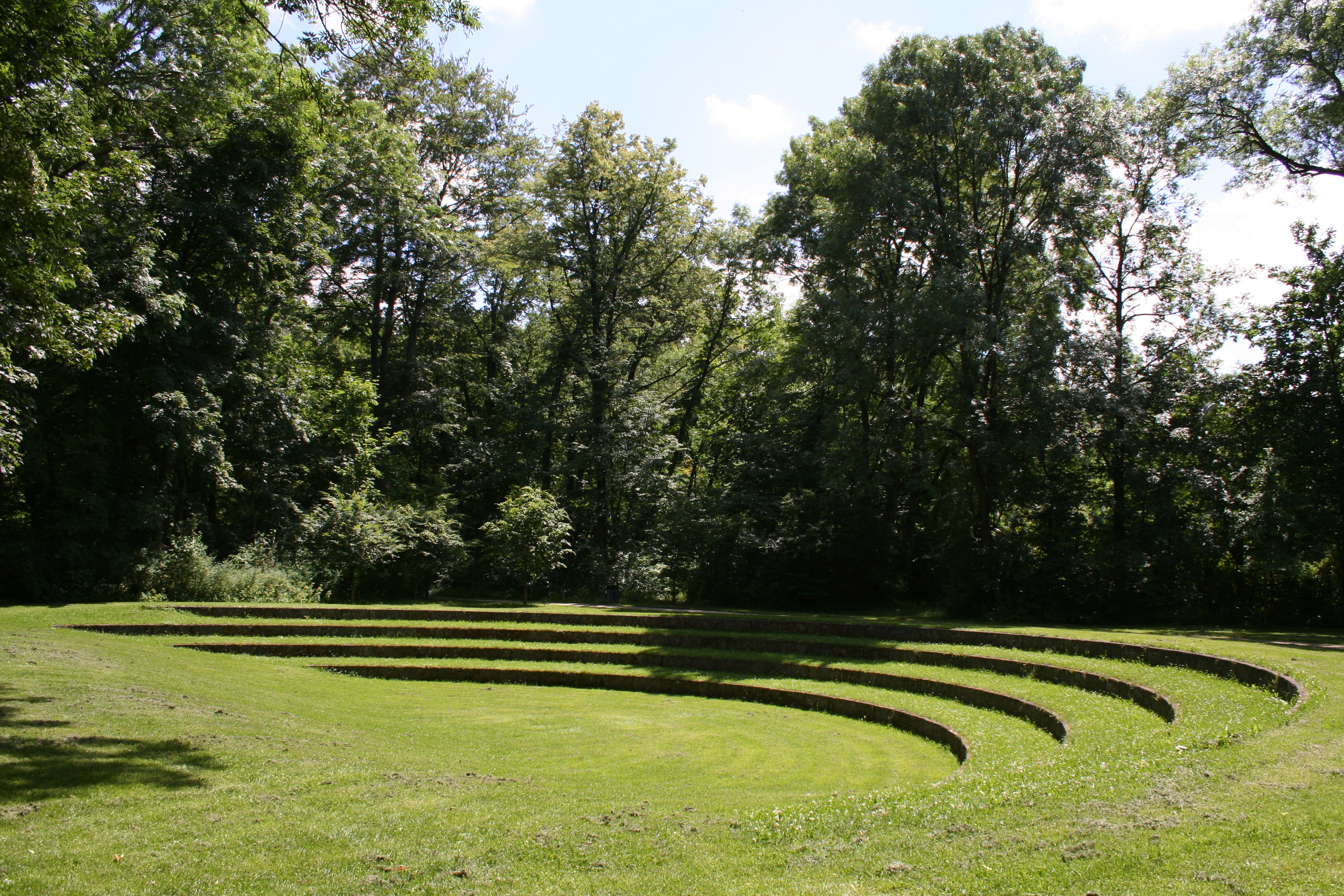
Open air theatre

The northern part of the garden also contains a small amphitheatre, built in 1985 and called the new amphitheatre. (An amphitheatre built in 1793 to a similar plan, but in a different position, a little north of the Rumford-Saal, has not survived; this had been used primarily for fireworks exhibitions). The new amphitheatre is used for open-air performances in summer. To the east the Hirschau's border is formed by the Isar, which can be crossed at the Oberföhring dam (Stauwehr Oberföhring), built between 1920 and 1924, and at the Emmeram Bridge, a wooden pedestrian bridge first built in 1978. The bridge was destroyed by arson in 2002, and replaced by a new design in 2004.

== Statistics ==
- Area: 3.73 km^{2}
- Total length of paths and walkways: roughly 75 km (26 km roads, 36 km footpaths, 13 km bridlepaths)
- Length of streams: 15 km
- Bridges: over 100
- Number of bird species that breed in the Garden: 50–60

== Literature ==
- C. Bauer, Der Englische Garten in München. Munich: Harbeke, 1964
- J. H. Biller and H.-P. Rasp, München, Kunst und Kultur. Munich: Südwest, ed. 18, 2006. ISBN 978-3-517-06977-7
- T. Dombart, Der Englische Garten zu München. Munich: Hornung, 1972. ISBN 3-87364-023-6
- P. Freiherr von Freyberg (ed.), Der Englische Garten in München. Munich: Knürr, 2000. ISBN 3-928432-29-X
- E. D. Schmid (ed.), Englischer Garten München. Munich: Bayerische Verwaltung der staatlichen Schlösser, Gärten und Seen, ed. 2, 1989
