= Rafael Werneck =

Brazilian footballer (born 2005)

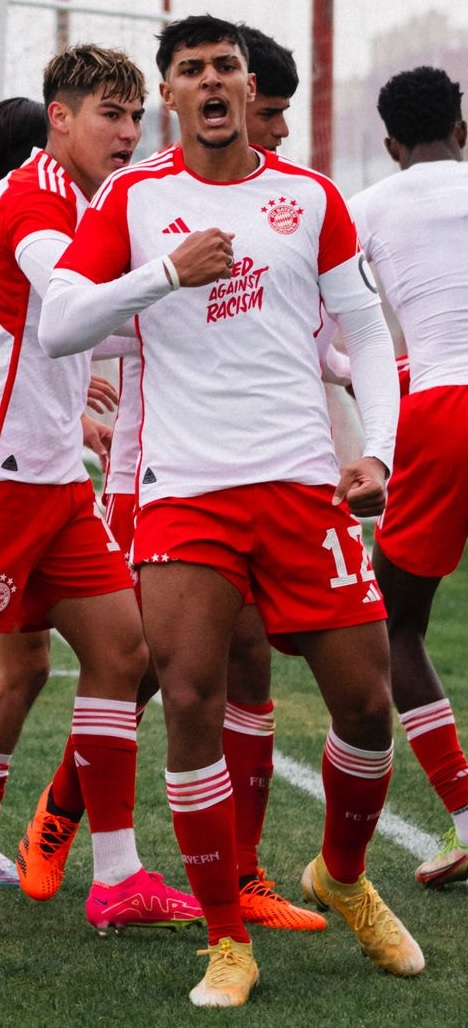
- Werneck with the Bayern Munich World Squad

Personal information
- Full name: Rafael Ribeiro Werneck Matta
- Date of birth: 18 January 2005 (age 21)
- Place of birth: Brasília, Brazil
- Position: Defender

Team information
- Current team: Al Granada

Youth career
- 2018–2021: Cruzeiro
- 2021: Atlético Mineiro
- 2022: Corinthians
- 2023: Avaí
- 2024–2025: Sfera
- 2025: Guarani
- 2025–2026: São Bento

Senior career*
Years	Team	Apps	(Gls)
2026	Sitra Club		
2026	→ A'Ali (loan)		
2026–	Al Granada	6	(0)
- * Club domestic league appearances and goals as of 29 October 2026

Rafael Ribeiro Werneck Matta (born 18 January 2005) is a Brazilian footballer who currently plays as a defender for Emeriti club Al Granada.

== Career ==
In July 2021, after three-and-a-half years with Cruzeiro, Werneck signed for Atlético Mineiro. The following year he signed for Corinthians, where he won the Paulista Cup Sub-17 in his one and only season with the club. Having signed for Avaí in 2023, he applied to German club Bayern Munich's World Squad initiative – a programme for international players under the age of nineteen to represent the club in friendlies. After two months in Germany, where he featured six times for the World Squad, he returned to Brazil with Sfera.

Named captain of Sfera, he helped the team compete in their debut Copinha campaign, where they were the youngest team competing in 2024. He was lauded for his performances in Brazilian media, with Portuguese club Famalicão reportedly making an offer for him. At the 2024 under-20 Paulista Cup, Werneck was part of a Sfera defence ranked fifth out of 69 clubs, as they reached the second phase for the first time in the club's history. He signed his first professional contract with Sfera in November 2024.

In March 2025, Werneck left Sfera – the club he had captained at under-20 level – to join Guarani. However, in October of the same year, he joined São Bento. In February 2026 he moved to Bahrain, signing with Sitra Club and immediately being loaned to A'Ali on a deal until the end of May 2026.

== Career statistics ==
=== Club ===
As of 29 October 2026.

Appearances and goals by club, season and competition
Club	Season	League			Cup		Other		Total	
Club	Season	Division	Apps	Goals	Apps	Goals	Apps	Goals	Apps	Goals
Al Granada	2026–27	UAE Third Division	6	0	0	0	0	0	6	0
Career total			6	0	0	0	0	0	6	0
