= Harthof =

District of Munich, Bavaria

Coordinates: 48.2056°N 11.5717°E

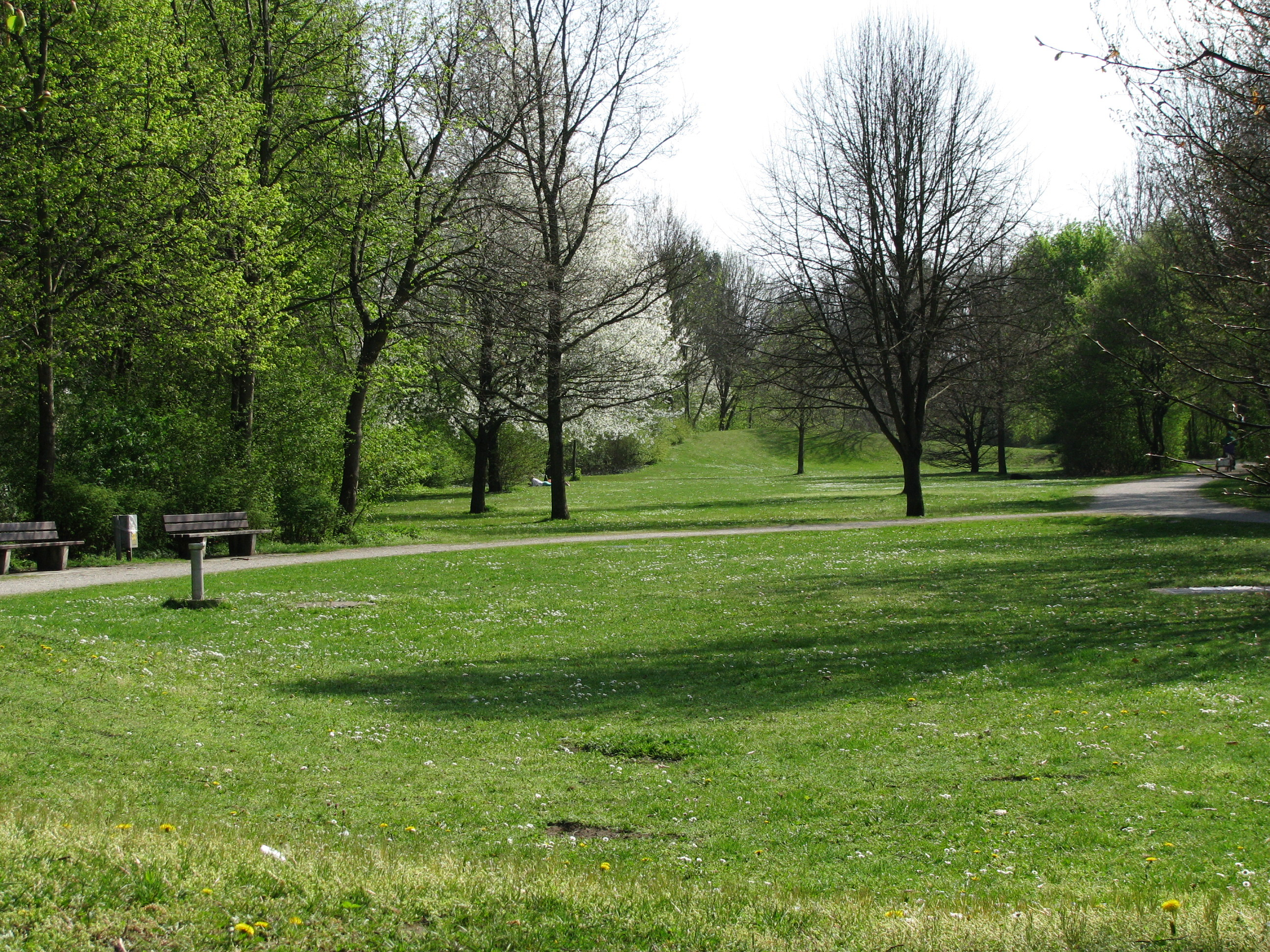
Harthofanger

Harthof is a district in the north of the Bavarian capital Munich. It is located in districts 11 Milbertshofen-Am Hart and 24 Feldmoching-Hasenbergl. Harthof consists of medium-sized housing estates (mainly west of Schleißheimer Straße and east of Goldmarkstraße) and an estate of older council flats (east of Schleißheimer Straße). The Harthofanger green area is located within.

== History ==
The districts of today's district belonged to Feldmoching and were mainly used as pastures. Several colonists settled on Schleißheimer Straße in the 19th century. The Bavarian Army's munition depot, known as the Powder Tower, had already existed there since 1838.

The Harthof estate, which gave the district its name, was built in 1890 by Munich's Löwenbräu director Wolf. The building was demolished in 1957, the subsequent building is still in Max-Liebermann-Straße today. The name originates from the Feldmoching field name Hart, which means forest or pasture land. The Harthof was regarded as one of the Feldmochinger colonies relatively far away from the village centre, such as the Fasanerie-Nord or the Lerchenau. From 1900 onwards, the colony expanded mainly into the area of Schleißheimer Straße and in the western part of the later district. Therefore, on 2 May 1922 the Freie Interessenvereinigung Harthof (free association of interests), the union of the colonists, applied to the Feldmochinger municipal council to name the settlement Feldmoching-Harthof. However, this application was rejected by the municipal council on 8 August 1922 and also by the district office Munich on 6 September 1922. The city of Munich acquired the Harthof estate in 1927 as a land reserve and in 1929 leased it to the Menrad family, which is still resident today. With the incorporation of Feldmoching, the Harthof colony was incorporated into Munich on 1 April 1938. The construction of some so-called Reichssiedlungen (state settlement) had already begun earlier - on the one hand simple apartment blocks with small courtyard gardens, mainly for employees of the Milbertshofen armament factories, and on the other hand small Reichssiedlungen of terraced and detached houses as a solution to the housing shortage in Munich. Between 1934 and 1939 the area was strongly influenced by the construction of various barracks Ernst-von-Bergmann barracks, the neighbouring Fürst-Wrede and Bayern barracks in Neu-Freimann as well as the Kronprinz-Ruprecht and Virginia barracks which no longer exist. The estate was severely affected by war in 1944, but agriculture was not abandoned until 1960.

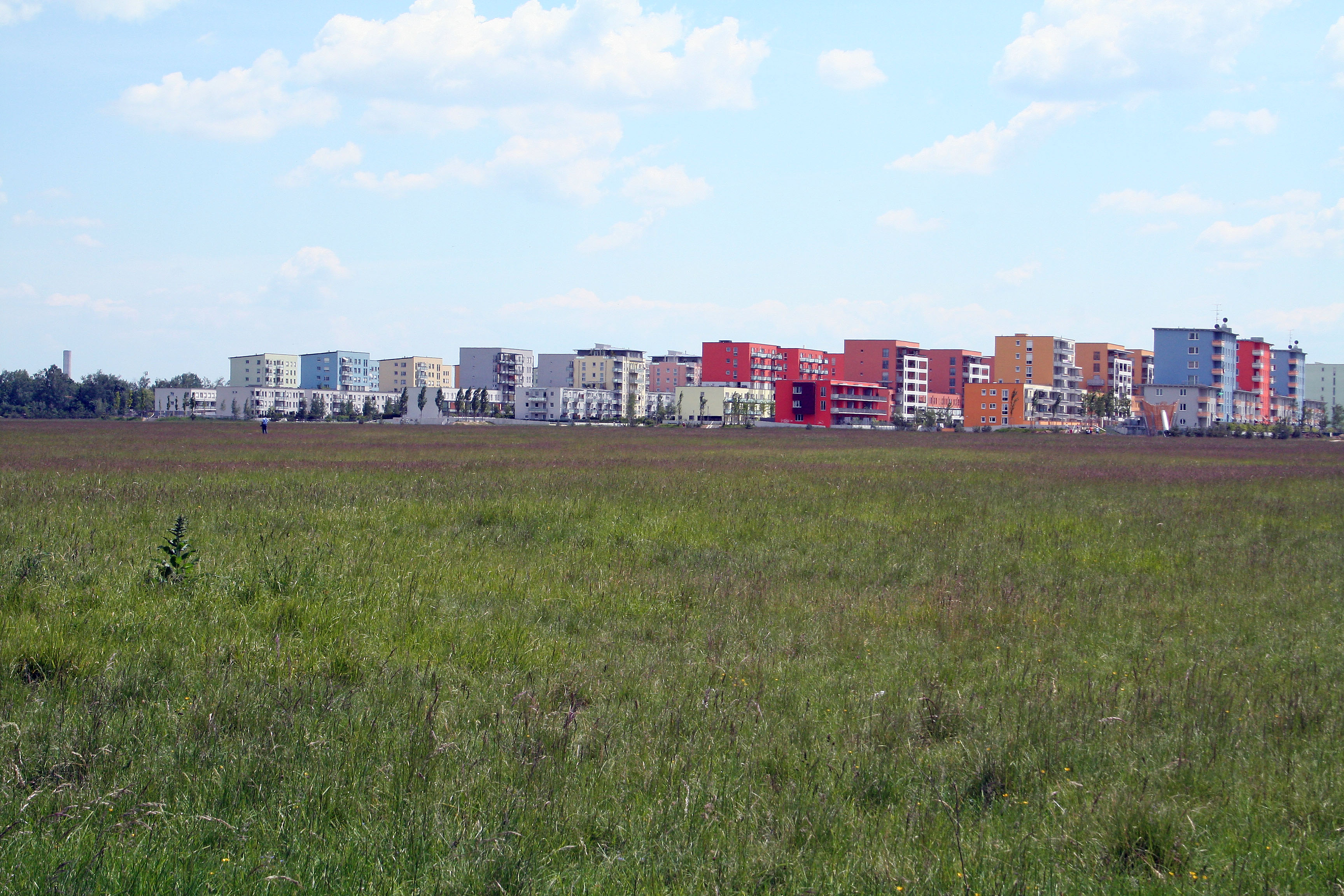
New development Nordhaide in the southwest of Panzerwiese

After the Second World War, extensive construction work was carried out. The population increased to 14,000 in a short period of time. Until about 1957, the GWG Gemeinnützige Wohnstätten- und Siedlungsgesellschaft (non-profit housing association) continued to build blocks of council house flats on behalf of the municipality, mainly in the area east of Schleißheimer Straße, in order to accommodate refugees, Munich residents and newcomers who had lost their homes as a result of war. Between 1952 and 1954 the Harthof housing estate was built in the western Harthof. The district centre was built at around 1955 in the area of Weyprechtstraße with the church St. Gertrud and the nearby Weyprechthof. On 14 July 1965, the city council designated the area between Dülfer-, Eberwurz- and Rathenaustraße as the Harthof district, which was later added to districts 11 (district Am Hart) and 24 (district Hasenbergl-Lerchenau Ost) through district reform. As expert reports had already highlighted in 1979 that a large part of the block stock of the GWG (a total of around 2000 residential units in the district) could not be refurbished, the city council decided in 2004 to draw up a development plan which provides for the demolition and new construction of the council housing stock in the eastern Harthof. The construction of the first stage in the Röblingweg/Lieberweg area has already been completed. On Panzerwiese along Neuherbergstraße, the Nordhaide housing estate was built in 1999, which has a sub-centre.

== Location ==
The Harthof is located north of the city centre. The following districts and outskirts are adjacent:

- Housing estate Am Hart
- Housing estate Neuherberg
- Housing estate Kaltherberg
- Lerchenau
- Hasenbergl
- Community of Oberschleißheim, District of Munich

== Institutions and associations ==
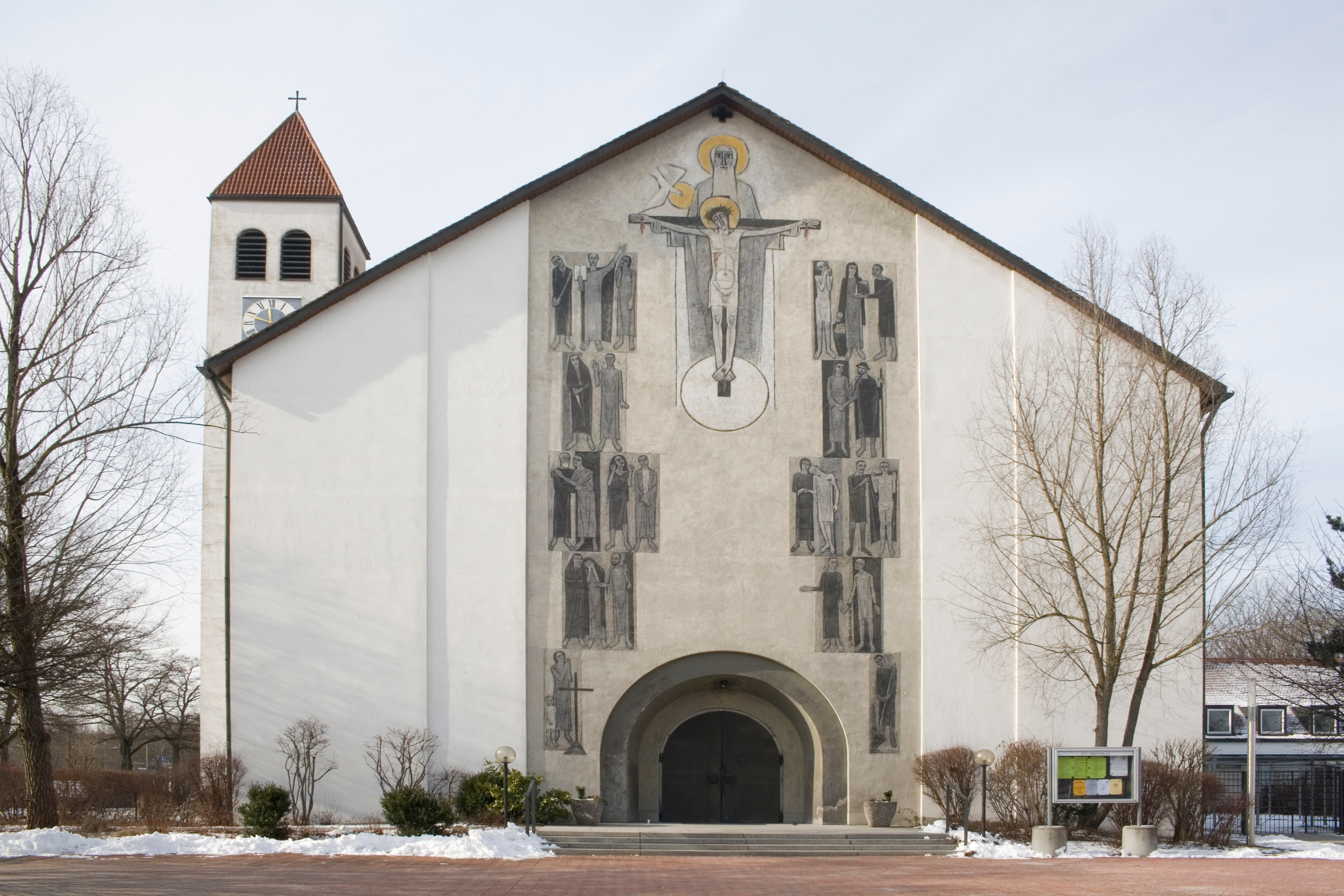
St. Gertrud in the Harthof

- Munich Volunteer Fire Brigade, Harthof Department. On 21 December 1921 a voluntary fire brigade was founded in the Harthof colony, with the fire brigade being set up the following year. From 23 January 1948 this was the breakdown relief of the Munich Volunteer Fire Brigade and became an independent fire brigade in 1951. The fire station on Heimperthstraße was inaugurated on 8 September 1979.
- Bereitschaft Nord 3 - Harthof/Hasenbergl of the Bavarian Red Cross
- Catholic parish St. Gertrud with kindergarten and library
- Protestant reconciliation church with kindergarten. Due to the increased settlement of Protestants, the construction of the Versöhnungskirche (München) (Church of Reconciliation) (consecrated on 30 June 1957) became necessary. The mother parish was the Dankeskirchen-Gemeinde in Milbertshofen, the reconciliation parish was established on 8 March 1960.
- A New Apostolic congregation was established in 1956.
- Sports clubs FSV Harthof e.V. and SF Harteck e.V.

== Social classes ==
After 1945 its population consisted of 80 % Christians. Due to the high stock of council housing there already had been an above-average proportion of socially disadvantaged groups at the Harthof straight from its construction, for which the district is also known. Through the redevelopment of the block structures the GWG is striving for a stronger diversity.

== Transport connection ==
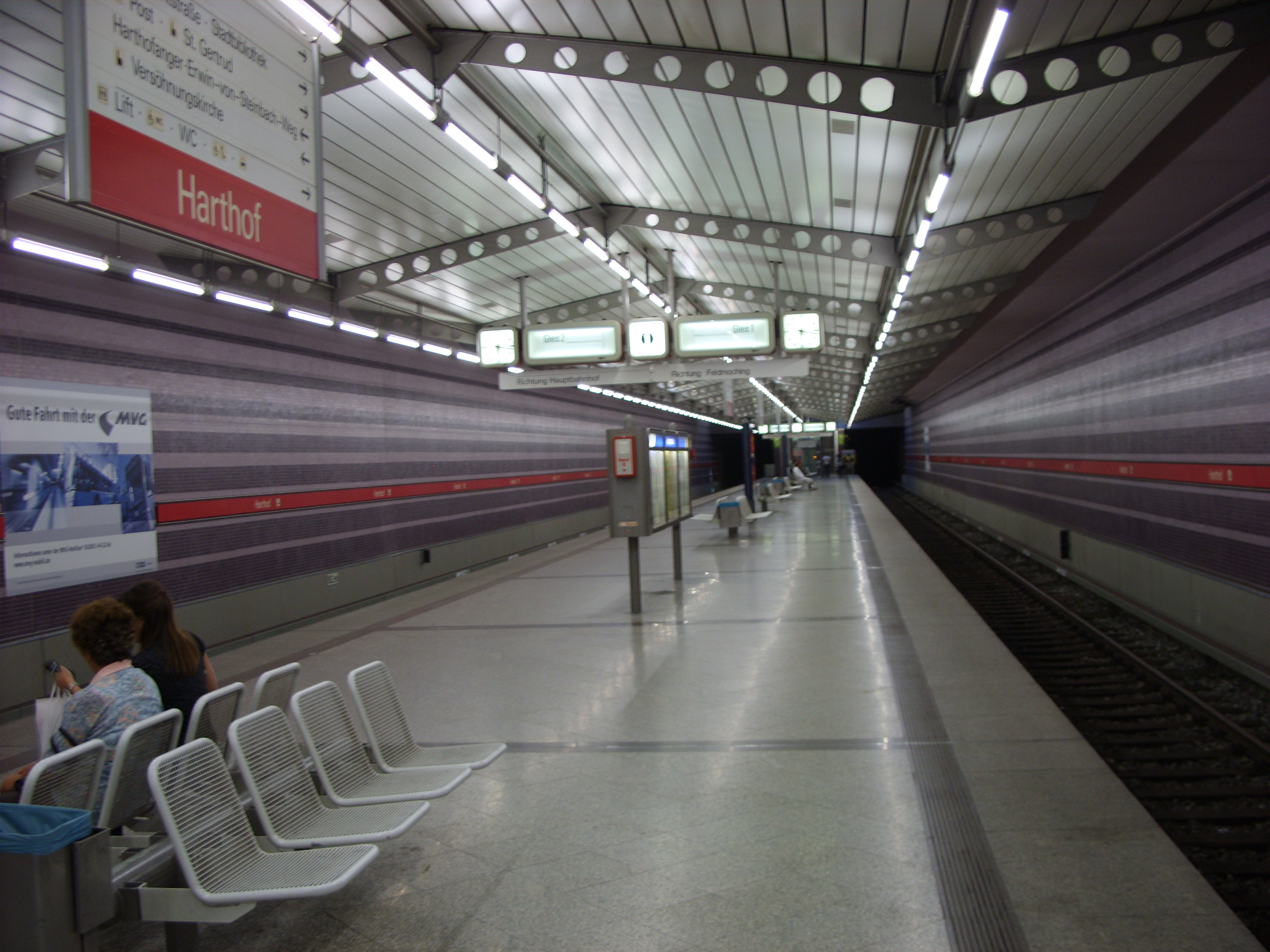
Harthof underground station

Harthof can be reached via the A99 motorway exit München-Neuherberg.

Local public transport is available at the Harthof stop of the Munich underground U2 line, which was opened in 1993. This line replaced the tram lines 12 and 13 to the terminal stations Harthof and Hasenbergl, which were terminated partly (12) or completely (13) at the same time on the section north of Scheidplatz.

== Literature ==
- Helmuth Stahleder: Von Allach bis Zamilapark. Namen und historische Grunddaten zur Geschichte Münchens und seiner eingemeindeten Vororte. Stadtarchiv München, ed. München: Buchendorfer Verlag 2001. ISBN 3-934036-46-5.
- Beate Freytag, Alexander Franc Storz: Milbertshofen – Die Geschichte des Stadtteils von der Schwaige zur Vorstadt Münchens. Buchendorfer Verlag München, München 2004, ISBN 3-934036-80-5.
