= Goldschmiedplatz =

Open space in Munich, Germany

Coordinates: 48°13′09″N 11°33′44″E

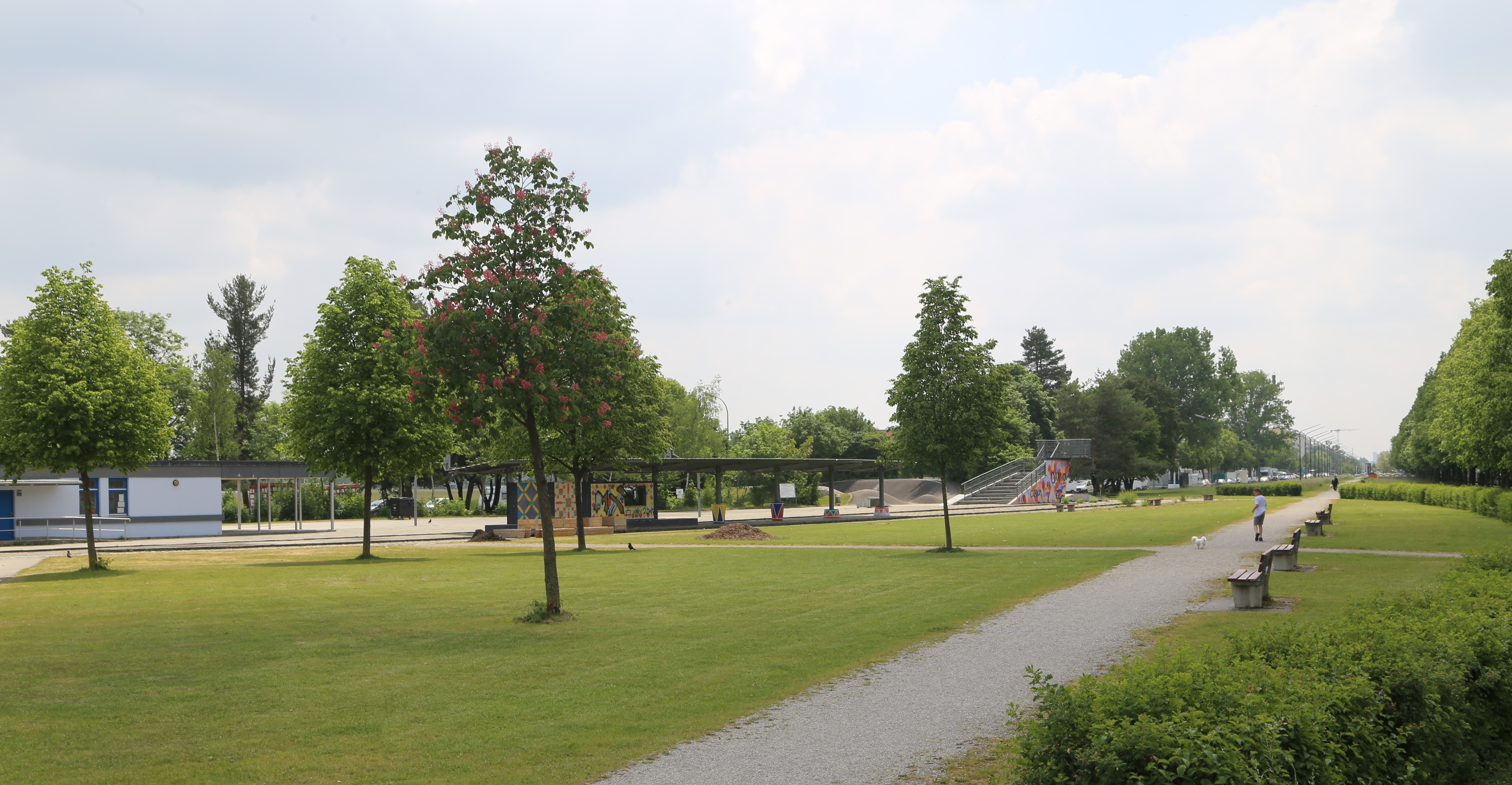
Goldschmiedplatz with Blauer Punkt, former track bed and viewing platform as well as princely axis

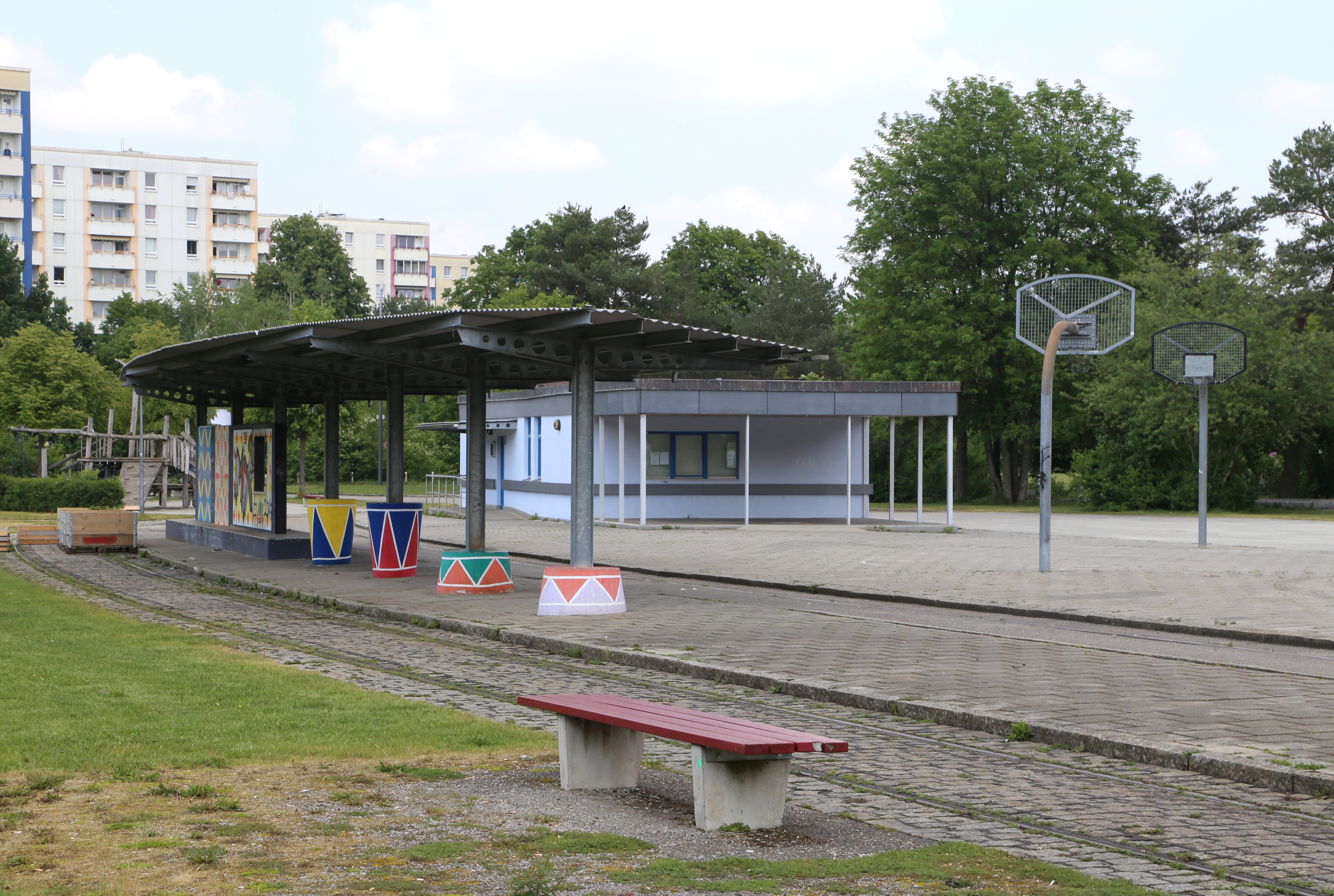
Blauer Punkt at the Goldschmiedplatz

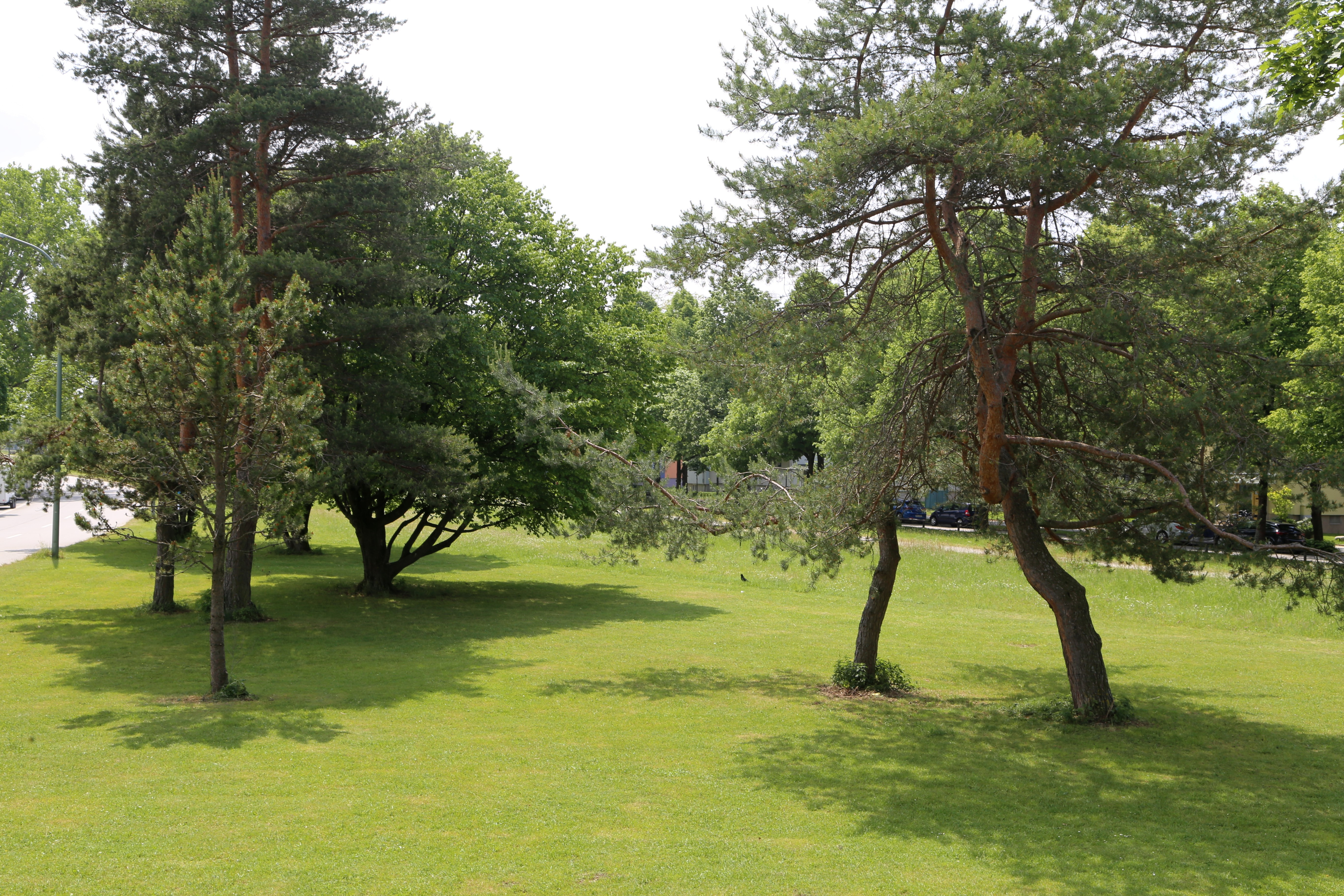
Green area

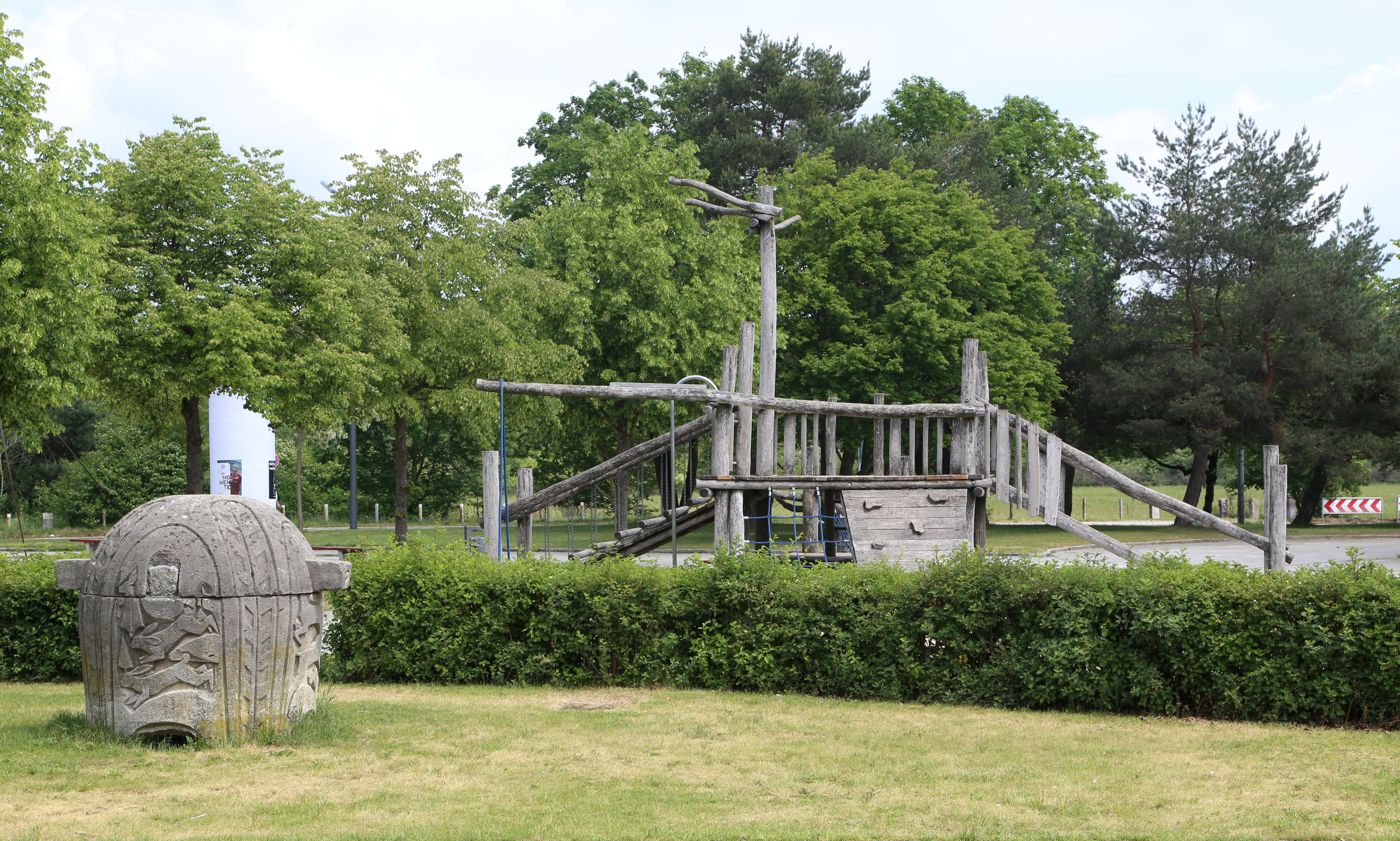
Sculpture by Hanns Goebl and playground

The Goldschmiedplatz is a 2.31-hectare urban open space at the northern end of Schleißheimer Straße in Munich's Hasenbergl district. It was originally a combined bus and train stop and is now a meeting place for residents and activity area. The founding family Goldschmied from the 14th century gave the square its name.

== Location ==
The 23,100 m^{2} Goldschmiedplatz is located at the eastern end of the Hasenbergl settlement in the far north of the city of Munich and borders directly on the Panzerwiese, a heath area of around 200 hectares, to the east. In the south lies the residential area Nordhaide.

Schleißheimer Straße, coming from the city centre in the south, ends in a loop around Goldschmiedplatz. With a length of more than eight kilometres, it is the second longest road in the city and forms the current end point of the Fürstenachse (princely axis). On this road the Bavarian electors once drove in carriages from Schleissheim Palace, about three kilometres to the north, to the Munich Residence.

Along the visual and historical princely axis of Schleißheimer Straße, between Goldschmiedplatz and Dülferanger, there is a promenade with various thematic activity areas into which the Goldschmiedplatz is also integrated. The axis, which runs along the middle section of Schleißheimer Straße, can only be seen today from the city centre to Goldschmiedplatz. From there you can see the towers of the Munich Frauenkirche, 10 km away.

To the north, Fortnerstraße branches off from Goldschmiedplatz and to the west Aschenbrennerstraße and Kugystraße.

== Utilisation ==
The Goldschmiedplatz is a multifunctional open space for leisure and residential activities. The centre is formed by the Blauer Punkt (Blue Point), the 25 m^{2} tram house managed by a residents initiative of the Diakonie Hasenbergl with the roofing of the former stop. A number of private and public events take place here, such as a regular flea markets or the Hasenbergl-Nord residents get-together. There is also a barbecue area, a viewing platform and a climbing playground for children. There is also a community garden supervised by Green City. For sporting activities, a volleyball court, table tennis, two chess fields, a boules court, a summer curling track and a large skate park are integrated into the surrounding park. Here you will also find a sculpture by Hanns Goebl and the Hasenbergl Monument, which commemorates the electoral hunt in the 18th century.

According to the Development Plan No. 40 Part 1 of 6 December 1966, the area is designated as a public transport area. The Goldschmiedplatz is governed by the green spaces charter of the state capital Munich. As part of the Historische Sichtachse Schleißheimer Straße (historical visual axis), the square is a place of cultural history and occasionally a location for cultural events.
