= Panzerwiese =

Heath in Munich, Germany

Coordinates: 48.217°N 11.576°E

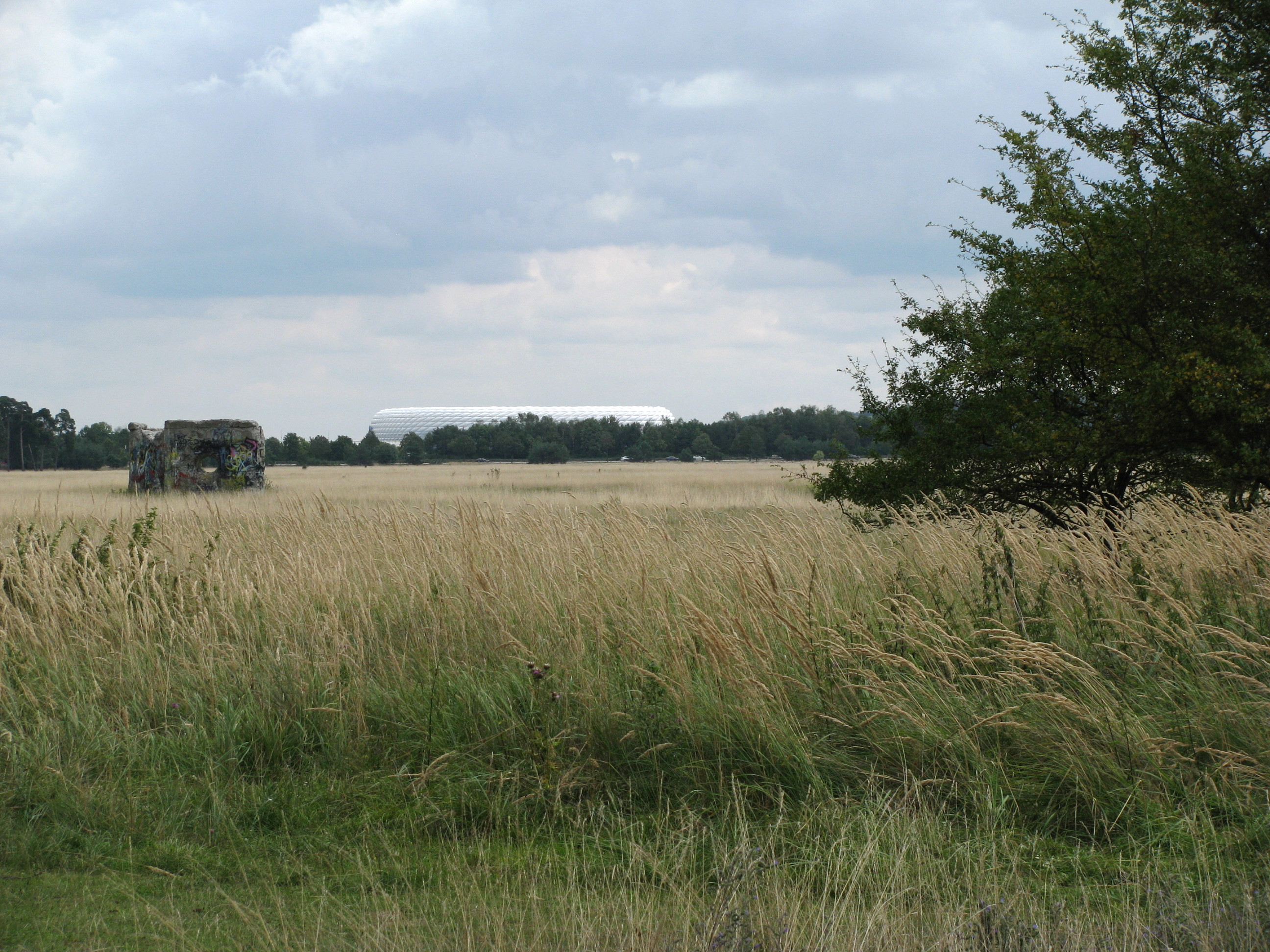
Panzerwiese with Allianz Arena in the background

The Panzerwiese is a 200 hectare heath area in Milbertshofen-Am Hart in the north of Munich, Germany.

It bears its name due to its former military use as a training area for tanks (German: Panzer and meadow German: Wiese). The name "Nordhaide" is often used analogously to Panzerwiese due to the settlement of the same name.

It is part of the "Naturschutzgebiet" (protected nature area) Panzerwiese und Hartelholz. It belongs to the Munich Green Belt. It has been registered with the EU as a Fauna-Flora-Habitat area (heathland and turf forests north of Munich).

== Location ==
North of it lies a forest area, the Hartelholz, northeast the Fröttmaninger Heide and in the south settlement areas along the Neuherbergstraße. In the west the meadow is bordered by Schleißheimer Straße (near Goldschmiedplatz) and in the east by Ingolstädter Straße or Ingolstädter Landstraße (B13). The Panzerwiese is located between the districts Hasenbergl and Harthof (district Milbertshofen-Am Hart, district Am Hart) and Neuherberg.

== Characteristics ==
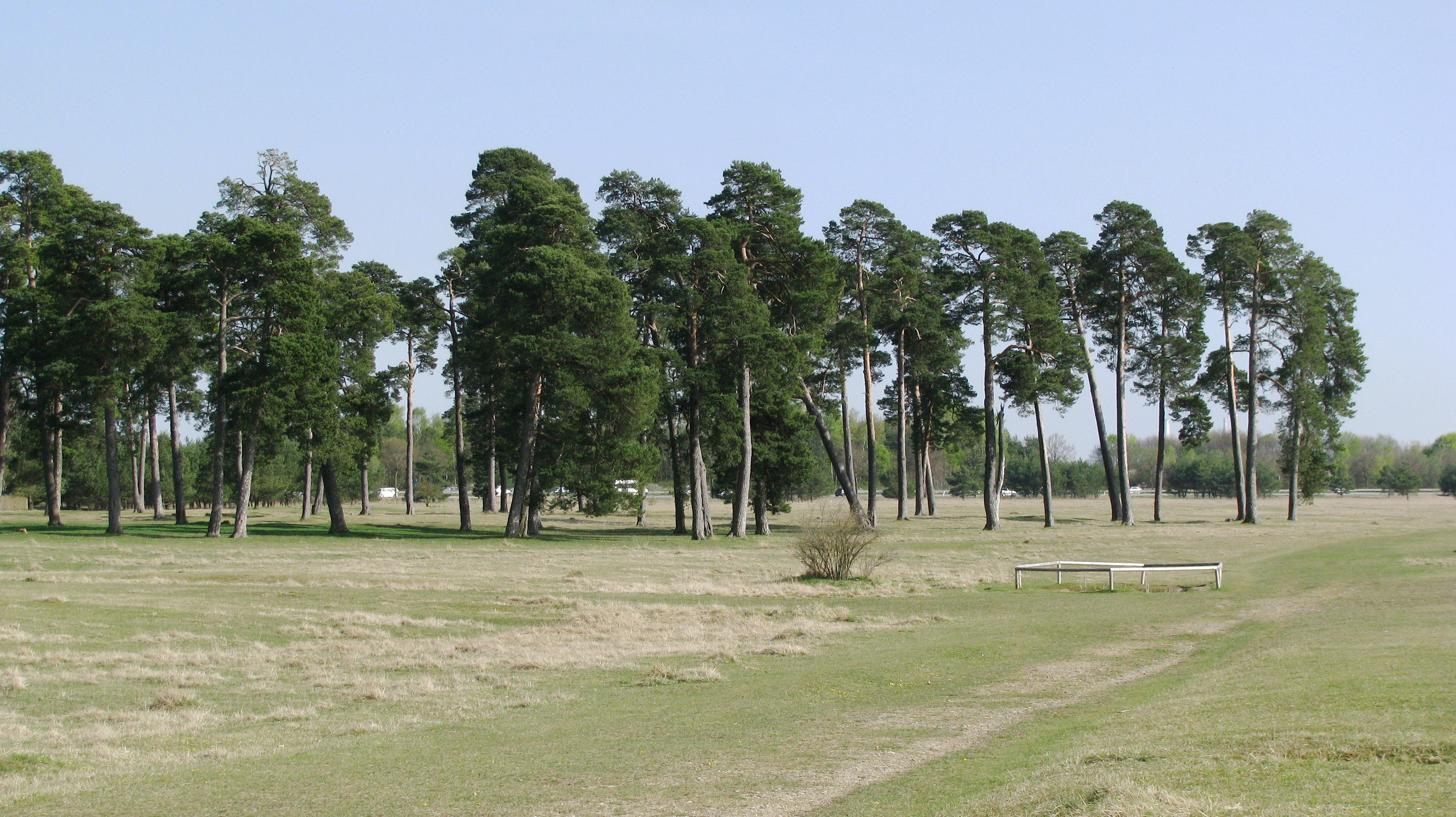

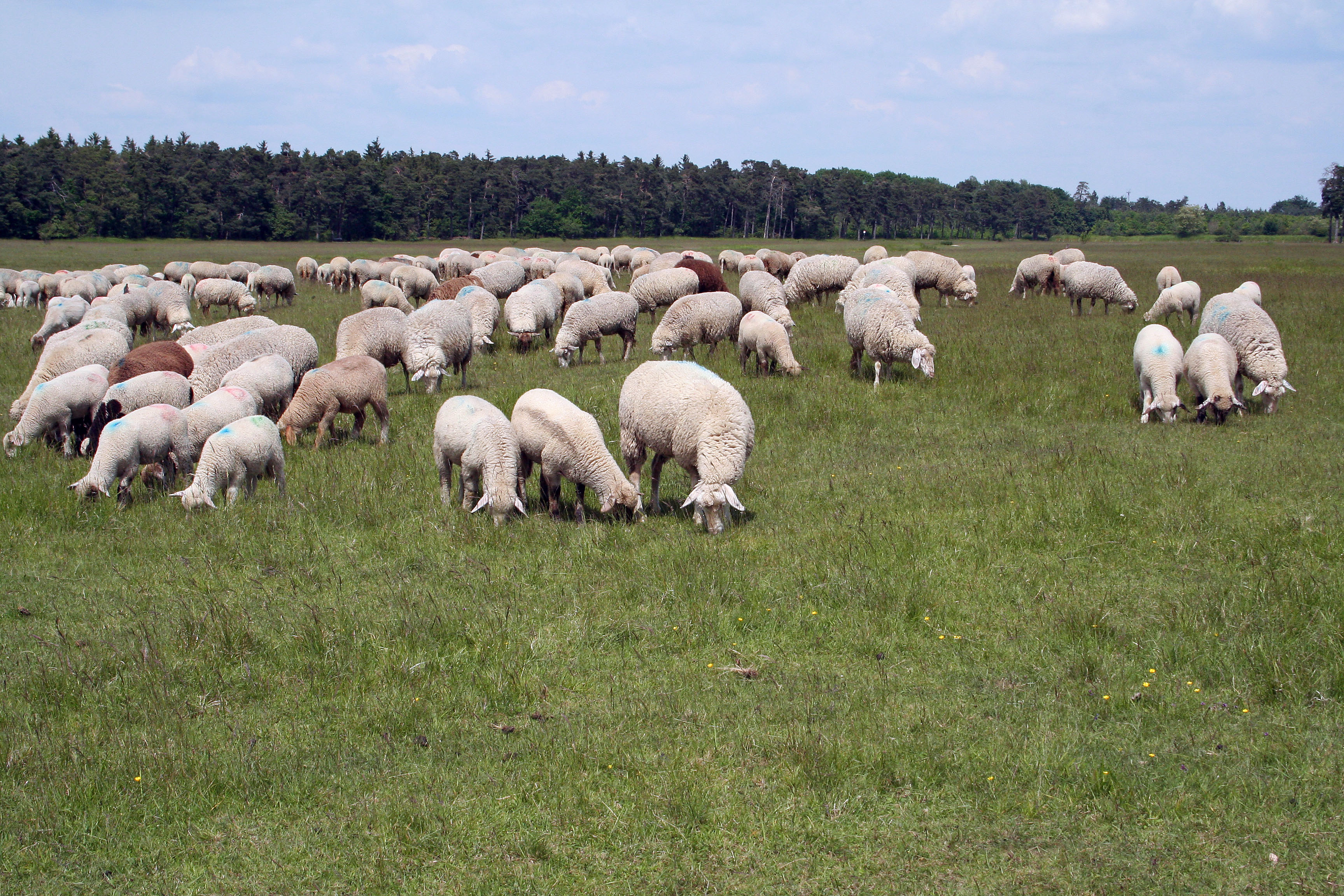

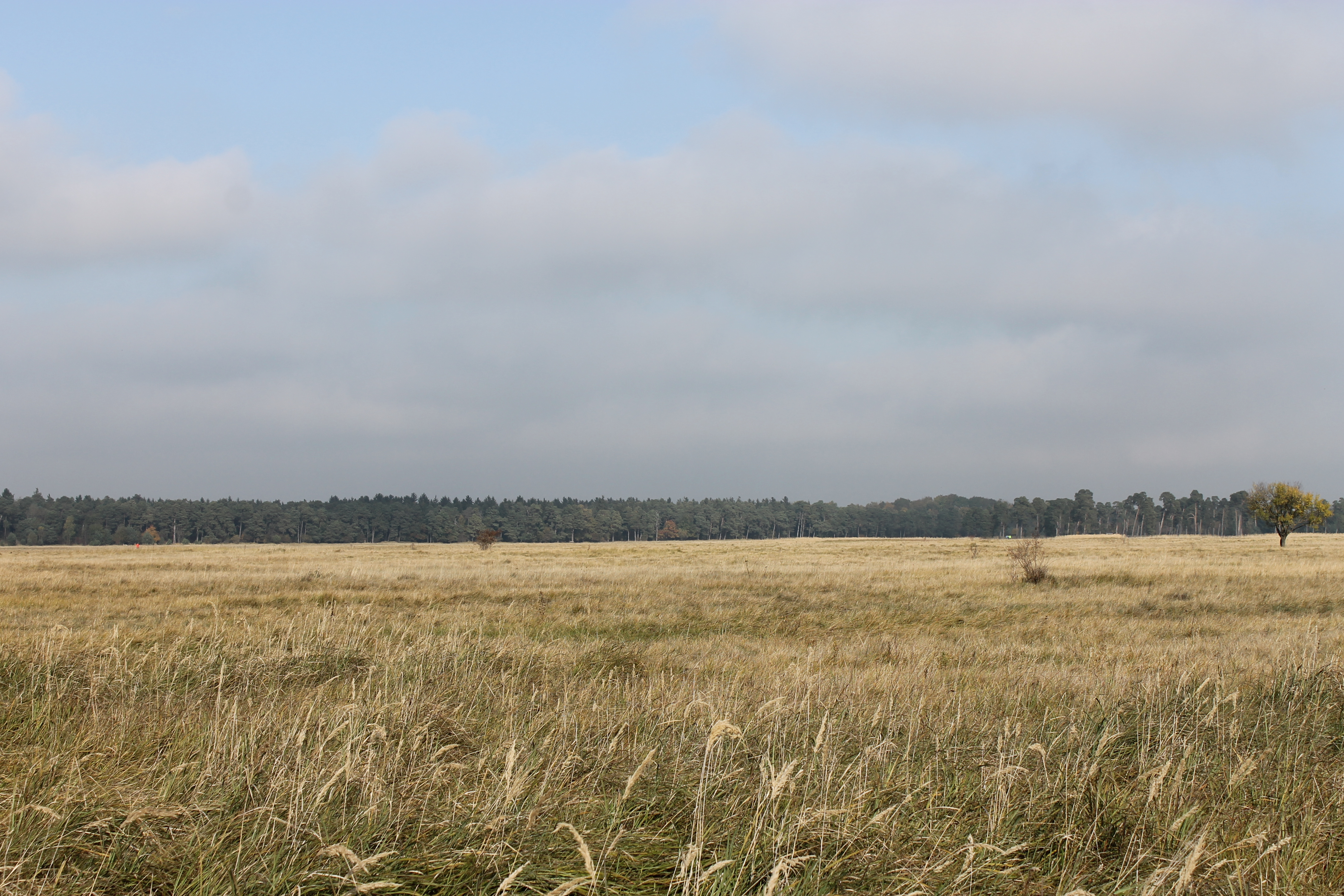

The Panzerwiese is located in the Munich gravel plain in the subarea of the Garching gravel tongue on the glacial gravel deposits of the Isar. The soil type is a shallow and nutrient-poor harvestation soil with high water permeability and low filtration capacity.

The meadow is overgrown with limestone meadows and represents about one third of the remaining heath area of the Munich gravel plain. The meadow is practically treeless and shrubless. Only with the construction of the settlement "Nordhaide" were trees planted in the residential area. About 180 plant species were identified on the Panzerwiese, 23 of which are listed on the Red List, for example the Clusius gentian. In addition, the Panzerwiese meadow with the hardwood to the north provides habitat for various animal species (partridge, sparrow hawk, wild rabbit or various bee species), of which 35 species are on the Red List. From the early summer of each year, the Panzerwiese is also used as a sheep pasture.

== History ==
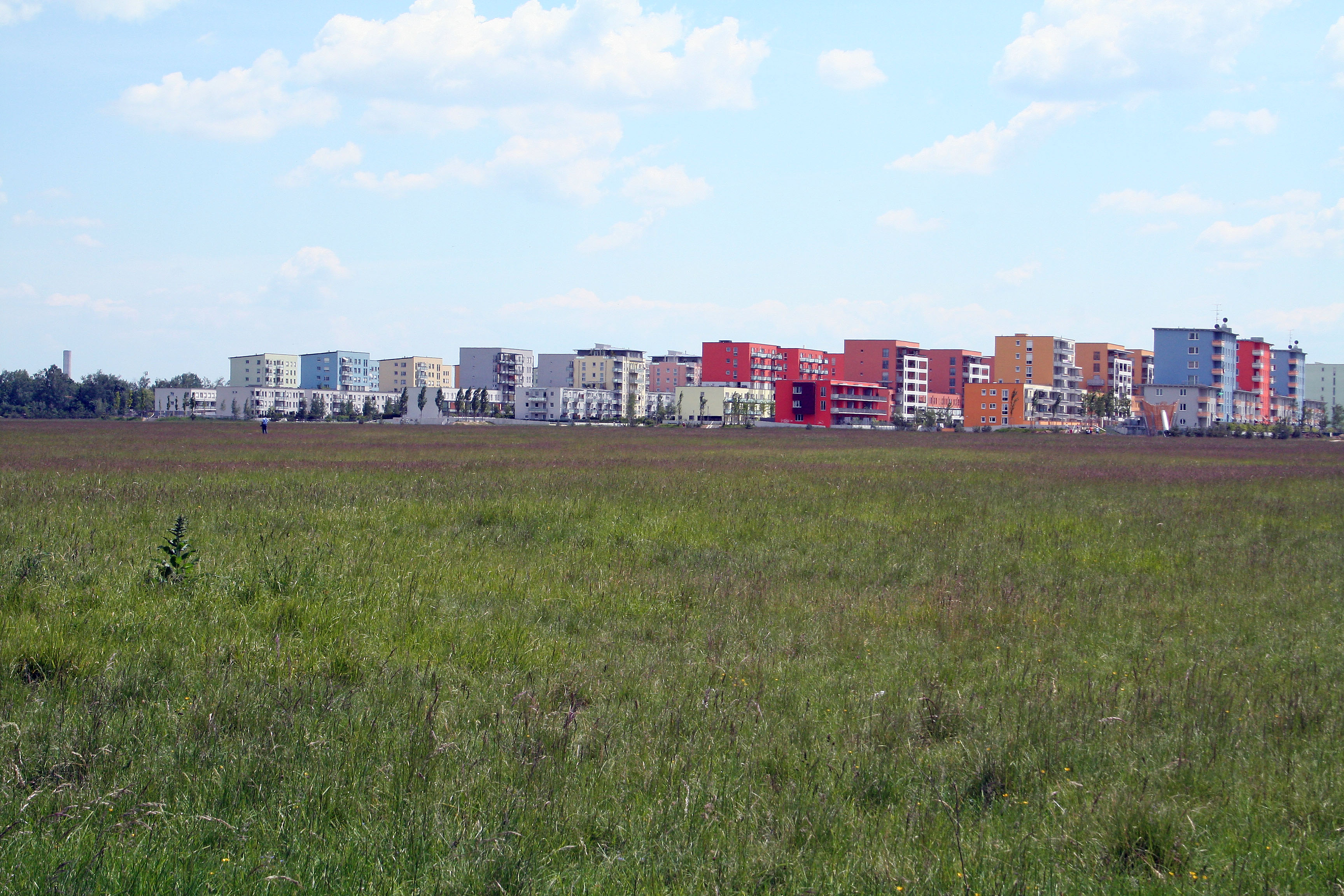
New development area "Nordhaide" in the southwestern part of the Panzerwiese

Until the end of the 1980s the Panzerwiese was used as a military training area ("Training Area Warner Kaserne" - M-T-238); until the end of the 1960s the airfield Warner Strip was found here and was closed to the public, some concrete fragments still remind us of this past. As the blockade was only communicated by isolated signs and was not visibly monitored, especially from the mid-1970s onwards, civilian use by walkers and children already prevailed at this time.

The city of Munich bought the site in 1994. The open space was to be developed in order to counter the tense housing market in Munich. An expert opinion already drawn up in 1990, referring to the ecological significance, came to the conclusion that only the southern part of the meadow should be developed. The settlement known as Nordhaide comprises several three- to eight-storey apartment blocks with around 2,500 residential units, including a student residence, as well as various commercial areas (medical centre, Mira shopping centre and others).

Until 1993, the underground line U2 was extended from Scheidplatz to Dülferstraße. The line passes under the south-western part of the Panzerwiese between Harthof and Dülferstraße. The tunnel and the double-track railway station were mostly built in an open cut, as the Panzerwiese was still undeveloped at that time. The exit of the underground station Dülferstraße to the Panzerwiese was not completed until 2002, since there was no need for it before due to a lack of residential buildings.

Together with the hardwood bordering to the north and reaching up to the A 99, the remaining area of the Panzerwiese - total area with forest about 280 hectares - was designated a protected nature reserve on 5 June 2002 and registered with the EU as a fauna-flora habitat area.
