= Ingolstädter Straße =

Street in Munich, Germany

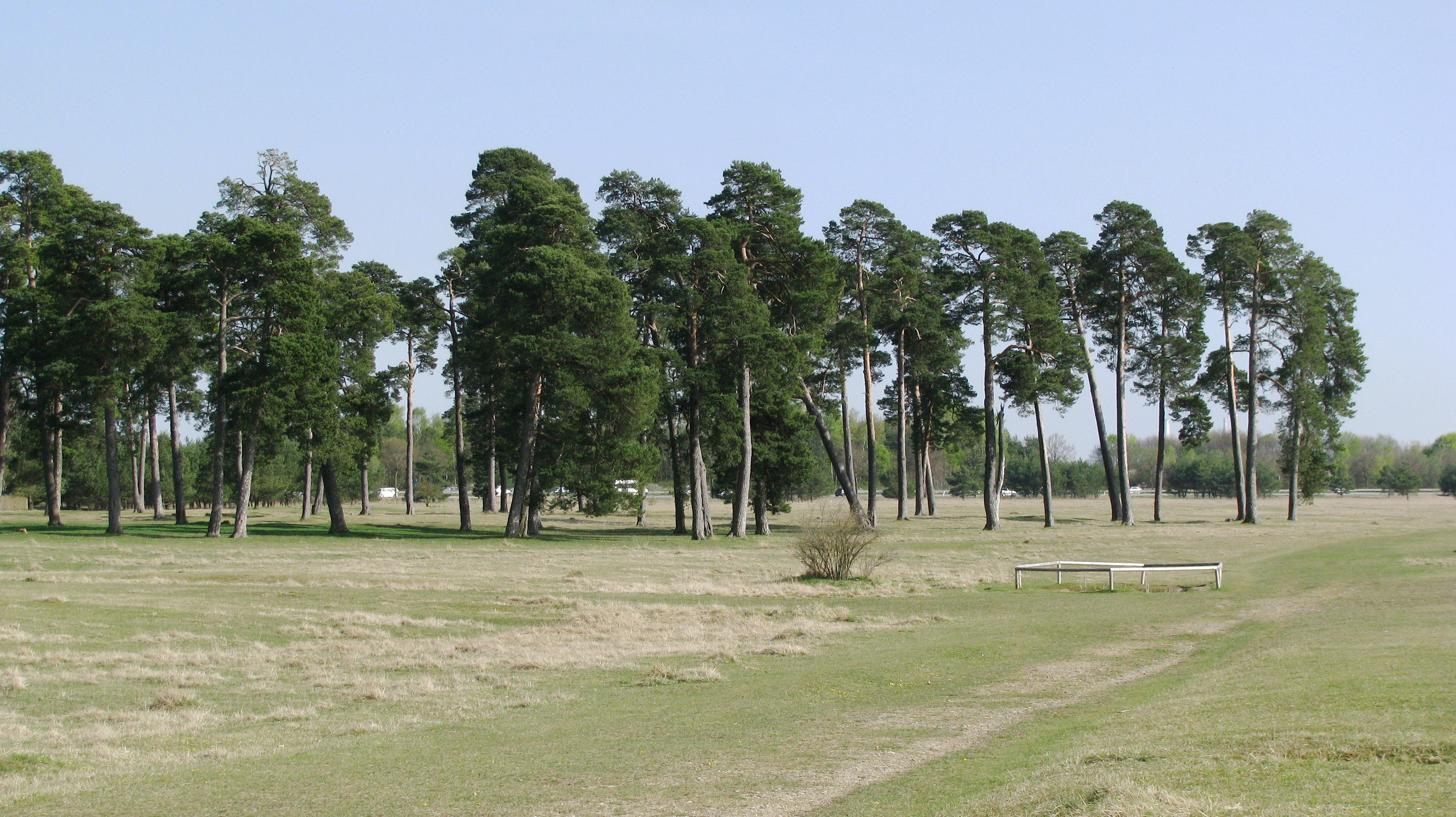
Panzerwiese to the north of Ingolstädter Straße

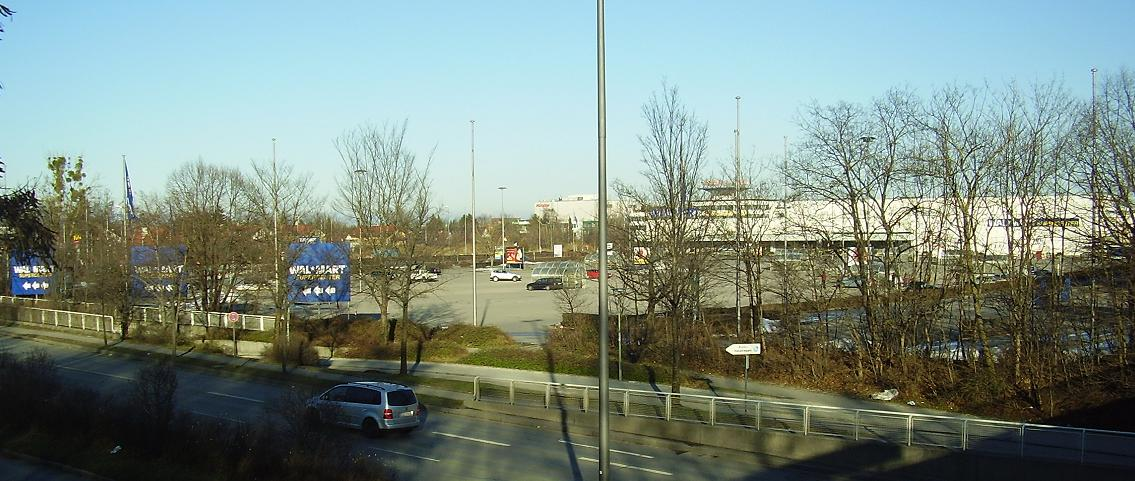
Euro-Industrial park on Ingolstädter Straße

The Ingolstädter Straße in the Munich district of Milbertshofen-Am Hart and Schwabing-Freimann is a 4 kilometer long exit road heading North, where it connects there with Leopoldstraße.

== Description ==
The Ingolstädter Straße runs from the end of the Leopoldstraße corner of Milbertshofener Straße and Domagkstraße to the north, where is crosses the Frankfurter Ring after about 250 meters, until the Panzerwiese, where from Neuherberg it continues as an extension of the B13 Ingolstädter Landstraße to Ingolstadt.

North of the intersection with the Frankfurter Ring, the Ingolstädter Straße crosses, by means of an underpass, the Munich North Ring railway line. In the underpass, from 1948 to 1949, was the public transportation stop Munich Ingolstädter Straße.

In 2017, the FC Bayern Campus was opened on the 30-hectare area north of the Fürst-Wrede-Kaserne east of Ingolstädter Straße, directly on the city limits. West of the Fürst-Wrede-Kaserne is the Ernst-von-Bergmann-Kaserne on the other side of the street. Both barracks are connected with a bridge for pedestrians.
