= Mira (shopping center) =

Coordinates: 48.21307°N 11.56360°E

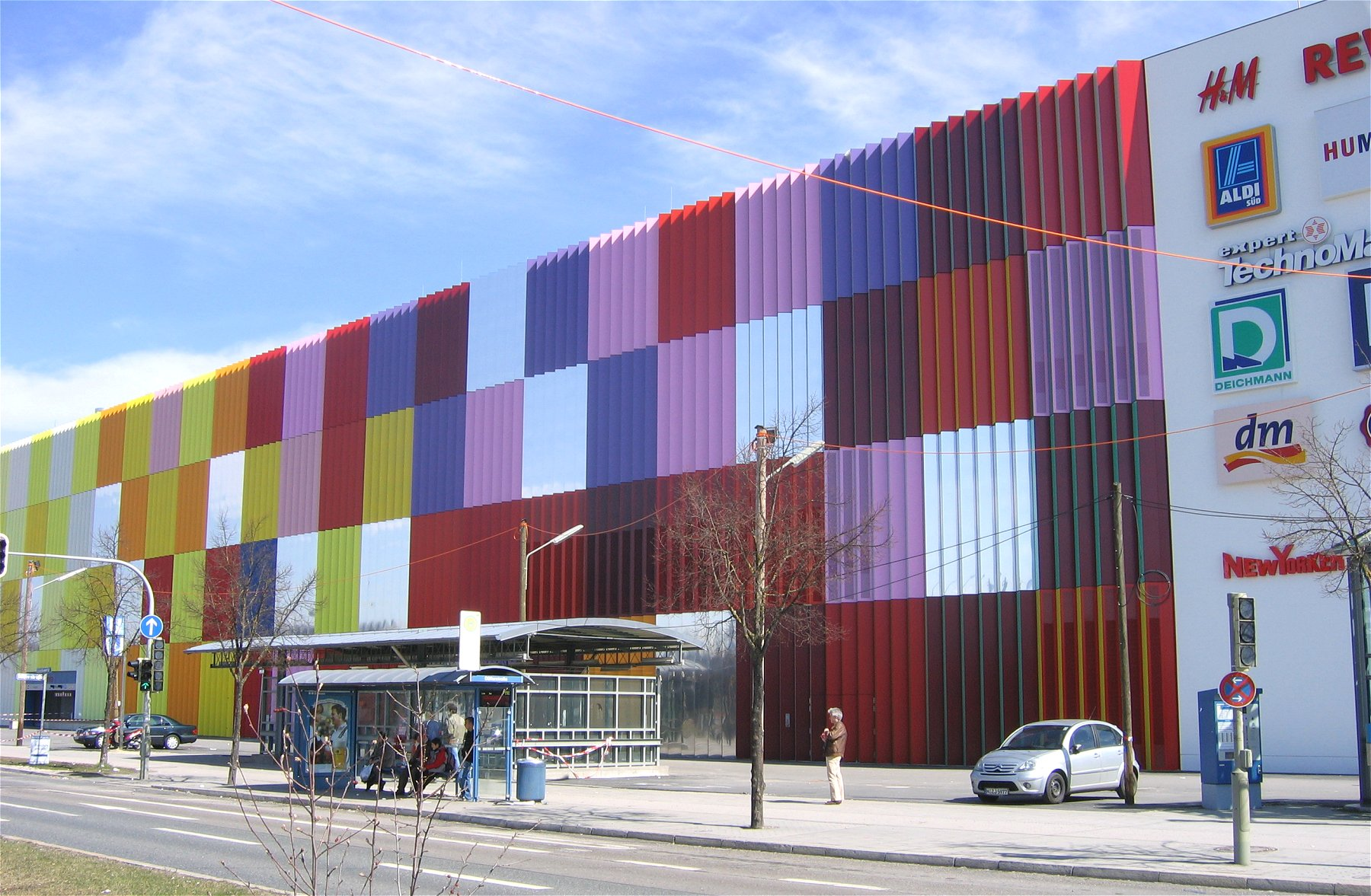
- Address: Schleißheimer Str. 506, 80933 Munich, Germany
- Opened: 13 March 2008
- Manager: KOPRIAN iQ MANAGEMENT GmbH
- Owner: GEPRO Wohn- und Gewerbebau GmbH & Co. Zwanzigste Immobilien KG
- Architect: Chapman Taylor; Léon-Wohlhage-Wernik
- Num. of stores: 66
- Floor area: 25.500 m^{2}
- Parking: 750
- Public transit: U1
- Website: www.mira-einkaufszentrum.de

The Mira is a district and shopping center that opened in 2008 in the Munich district Nordhaide at Schleißheimer Straße which borders the municipalities of Milbertshofen-Am Hart and Feldmoching-Hasenbergl.

== General Information ==
On 25,500 square meters, spread over three stories, there are 66 retail stores. The three stories above were built into a parking garage with 750 parking spaces. The shopping center, located on Schleißheimer Str. 506, can be reached via the A9, A99, as well as through a direct connection at the U-Bahn station Dülferstraße.

== Architecture ==
Project developer of the 120 million Euro project was FONDARA – Gesellschaft für Immobilienentwicklung und Projektmanagement mbH. Planning for the shopping center was done by Chapman Taylor, and the responsible project architect was Ruprecht Melder. The office of Léon-Wohlhage-Wernik-Architekten was responsible for the design of the façade. Construction began in 2005.

The West, North, and northern half of the Eastern facades, with a total coverage of 5,800 square meters, was made of colored lacquered metal panels which were placed on the walls to form prisms. Since the sides of the prisms have different colors, the façade appears from the southwest and northwest in different colors. In between, a gradual transition takes place, so that the building changes dynamically as one passes by. In addition to the colored panels, the façade also contains panels made of polished aluminum, which reflect the sky and surrounding buildings. The façade construction began in 2007.

Mira received the “DGNB Gold award for sustainable buildings” from the German Society for Sustainable Buildings in 2009. Mira is home to the largest thermal groundwater system installation for room cooling of all shopping centers in Europe. On top of that, 80 percent of the interior air energy from the fresh air exchanger, is recirculated into the buildings heat exchangers. Through this, 50 percent of the required heat output can be saved during the heating season. Overall, MIRA saves 40 percent of the final energy when compared to a conventionally built modern shopping center. In this way, emissions of around 1000 tonnes of carbon dioxide can be avoided. Within the scope of nationwide research projects, the environmental technology is to be continuously optimized even after the buildings opening.

In the so-called "North Forum" of the shopping center there is the fountain "Goldener Brunnen" with a floor area of over 50 square meters, in which the water area covers about 20 square meters. The fountain reaches a height of 15 meters. The fountain "Ab durch die Mitte" of the Nordhaideplatz in front of the southern entrance of the shopping center was designed by Alexander Laner and commissioned in 2009.

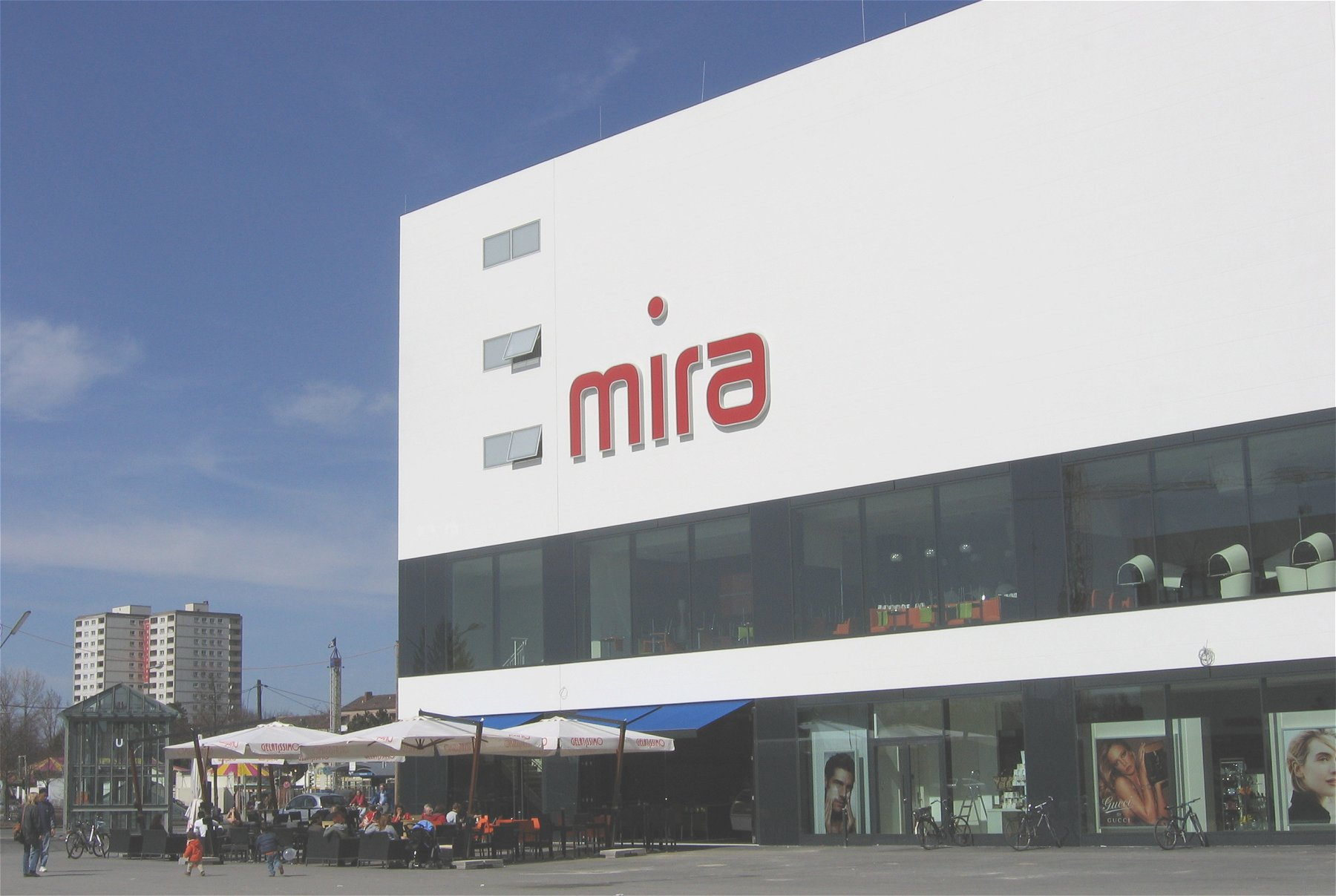
South Side

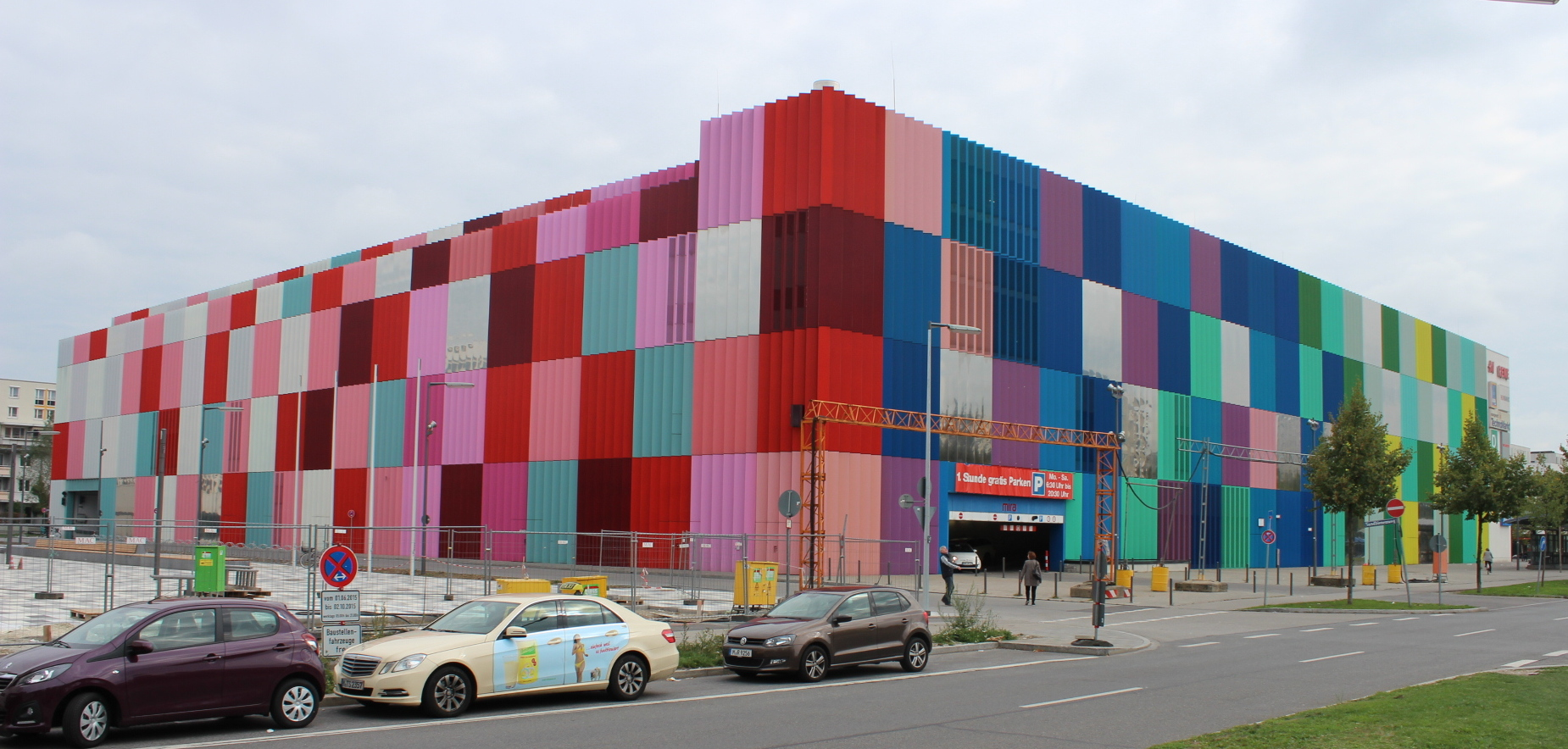
View from NW of the façade

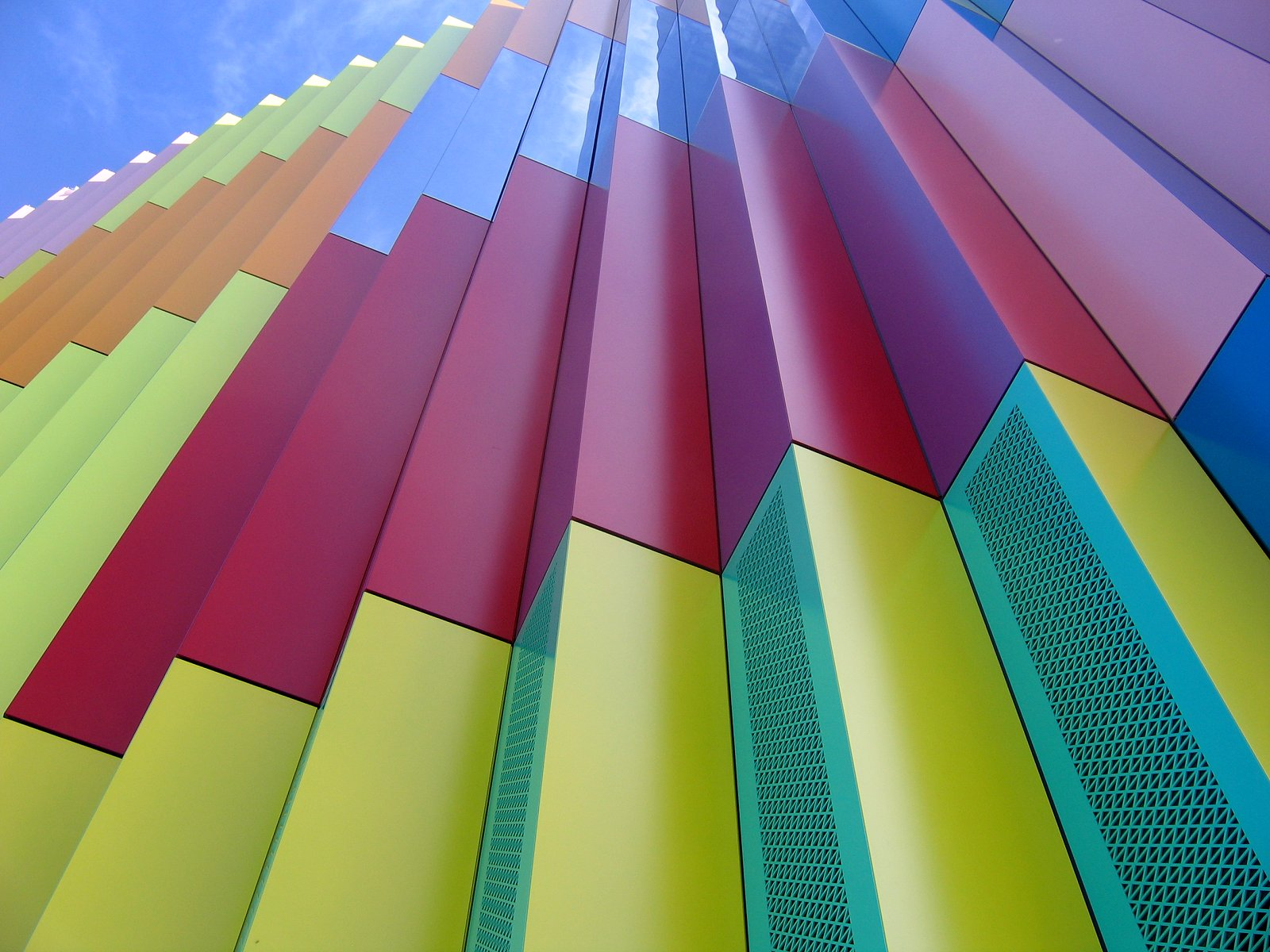
Colored metal prisms of the West façade

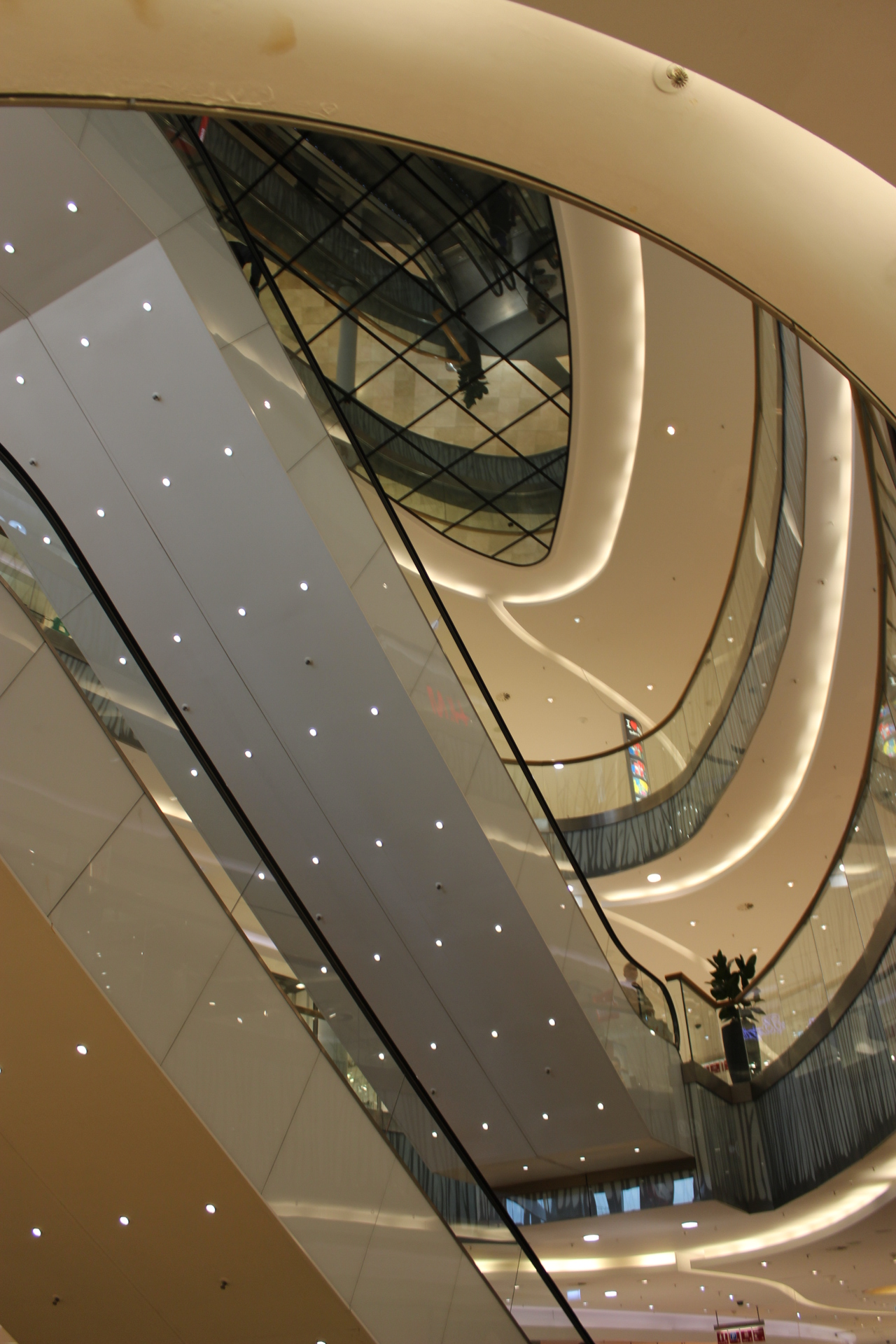
South Forum

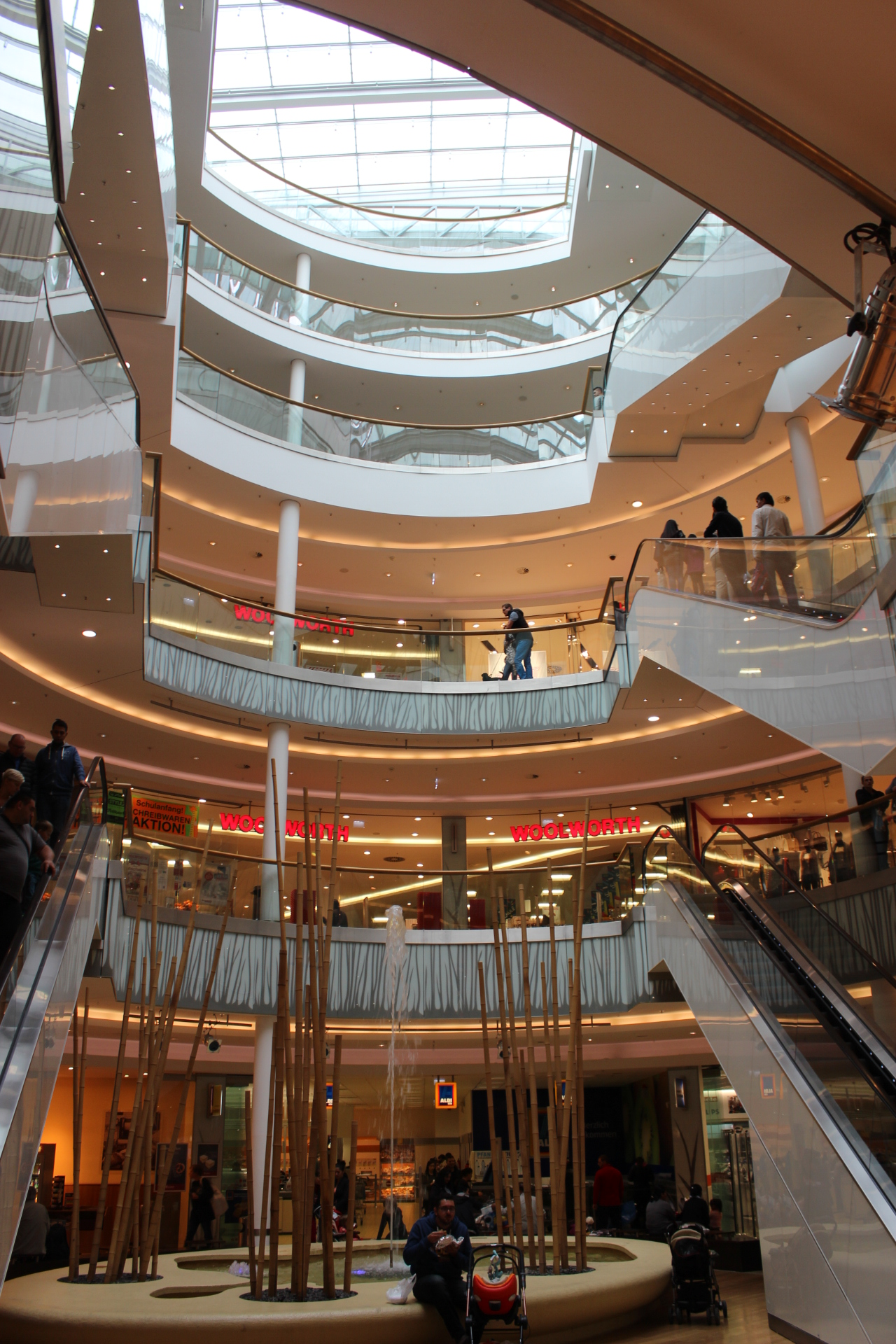
North Forum with "Goldenem Brunnen"
