= Hartelholz =

Forest in the north of Munich, Germany

Coordinates: 48.224°N 11.575°E

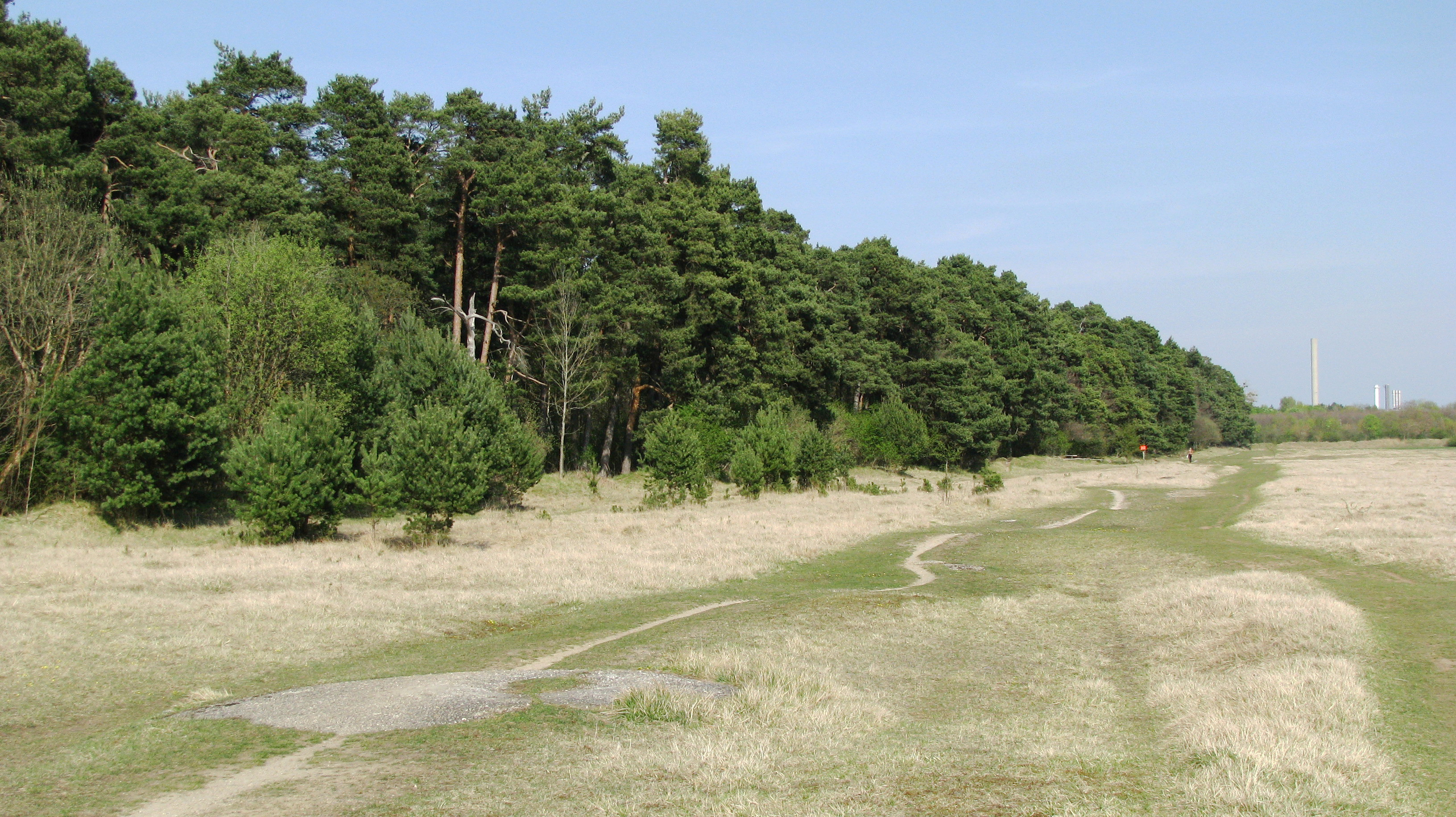
Hartelholz

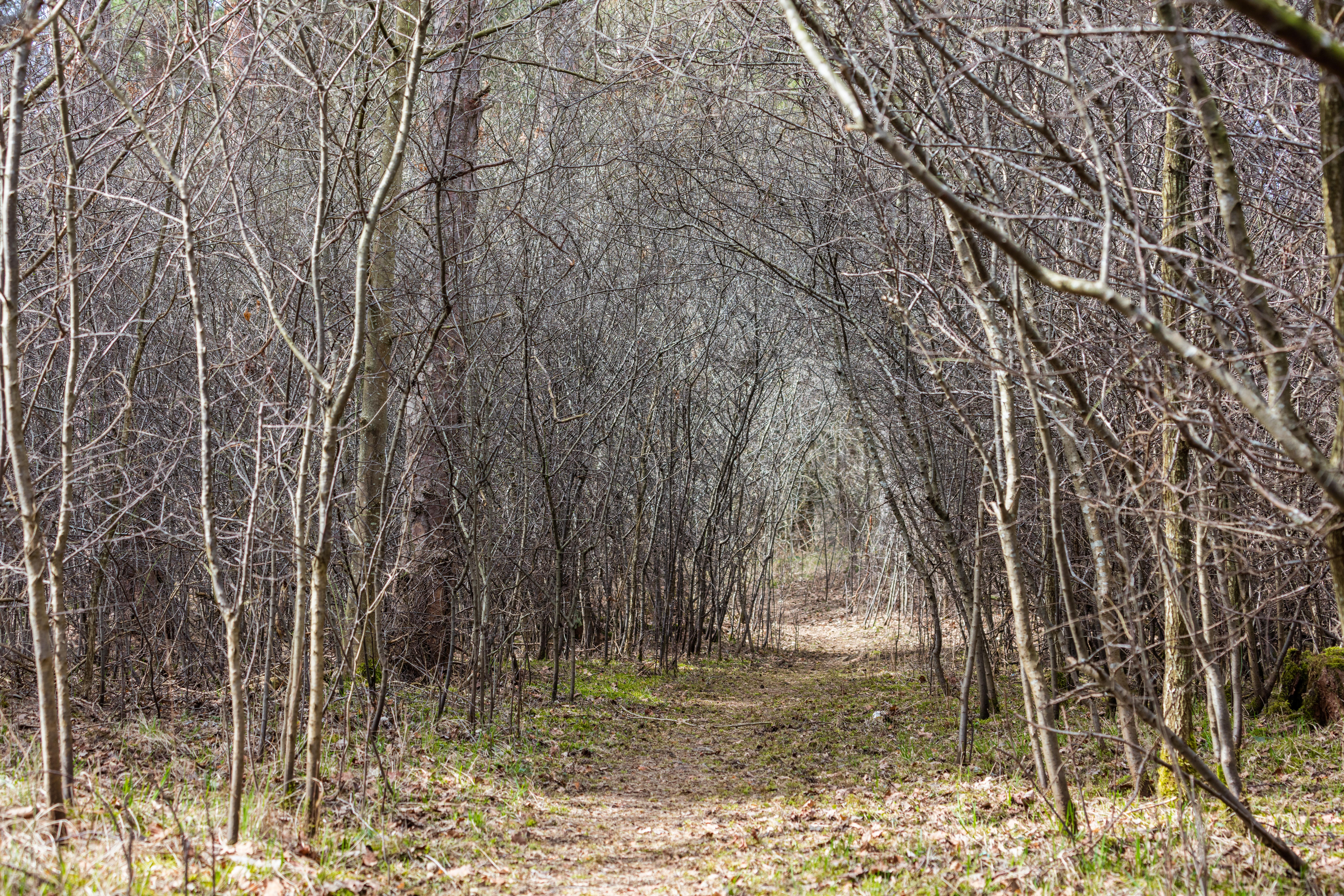

Hartelholz is a 115-hectare (280-acre) forest in the north of Munich, Germany.

It is located north of the Panzerwiese in the boroughs of Feldmoching-Hasenbergl and Milbertshofen-Am Hart.

It is classified as a Naturschutzgebiet protected area.
