= Schleißheimer Straße (Munich) =

Street in Munich, Germany

Coordinates: 48°11′01″N 11°34′00″E

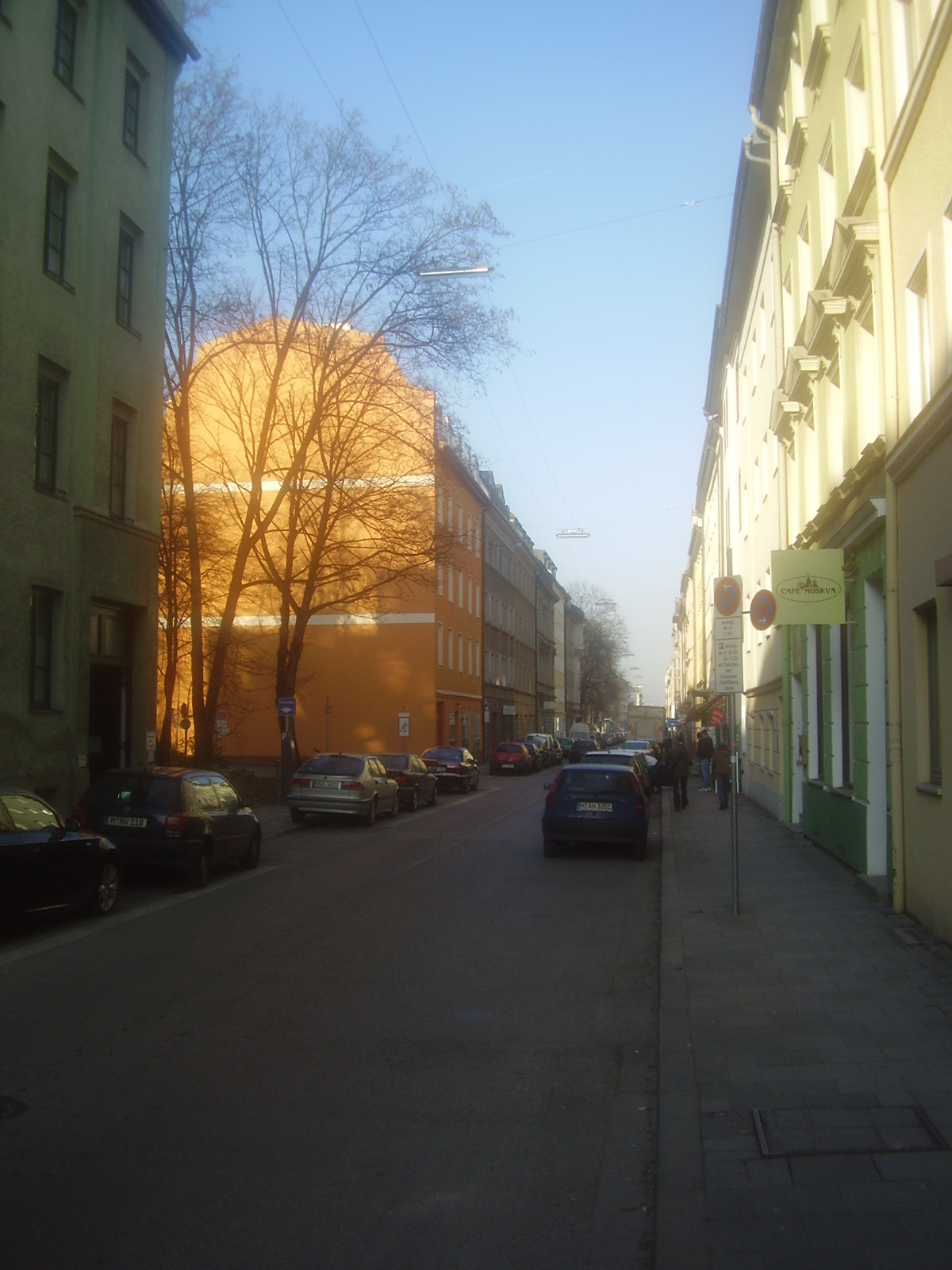
Beginning of Schleißheimer Straße at Stiglmaierplatz

Schleißheimer Straße is the second longest street in Munich after Dachauer Straße (11.2 km) with a length of 8.14 km. It starts in the city centre at Stiglmaierplatz, leads through five districts and ends at Goldschmiedplatz. It takes its name from the northern suburb of Oberschleißheim, where it originally ended.

== Course ==
The Schleißheimer Straße starts as a one-lane one-way street in the center of Maxvorstadt district as a branch of the Dachauer Straße a little north of the Stiglmaierplatz, leads past the Maßmannpark and runs almost straight from south to north through Schwabing, Am Riesenfeld, Milbertshofen, Lerchenau and Harthof to the district Hasenbergl. From the city centre to the height of Moosacher Straße / Frankfurter Ring, the road is mostly one-lane, with the exception of a section in front of Petuelring. Afterwards it leads continuously as two lanes up to its end at the Goldschmiedplatz / corner Aschenbrennerstraße. An extension to the north up to the A99 is being planned. Because of the adjacent residential areas, the Rathaus-SPD is also bringing a 2.5 km long tunnel into discussion, which could run north from the height of Rathenaustraße. A special feature of Schleißheimer Straße is the fact that you can see the towers of Munich's Frauenkirche almost along their entire length up to and including the end in Hasenbergl.

At the Schleißheimer Str. 142 in Schwabing there is the Nordbad in the district Milbertshofen at the Schleißheimer Str. 281 a bunker, the Kulturhaus Milbertshofen at the Curt-Mezger-Platz. At Schleißheimer Straße 387A there is the canal operating station of Stadtentwässerung München (city drainage), in Lerchenau at Schleißheimer Straße 393 the Virginia biotope, at Schleißheimer Straße 424 the research and innovation centre of the automobile manufacturer BMW, at Schleißheimer Straße 506 the Mira shopping centre, at Schleißheimer Straße 510 the school centre Nordhaide, the Goldschmiedplatz and finally the Panzerwiese.

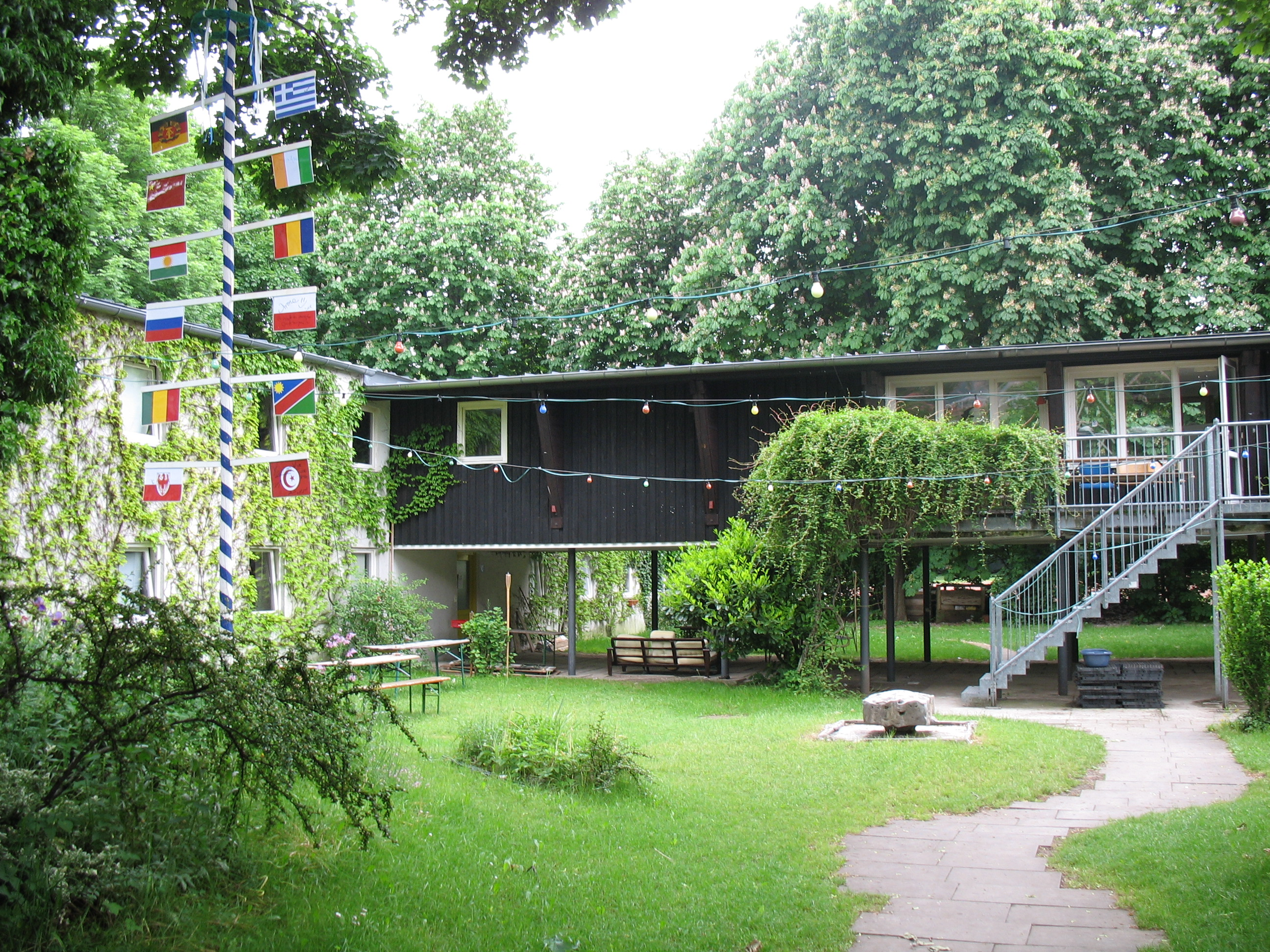
Maßmann Park

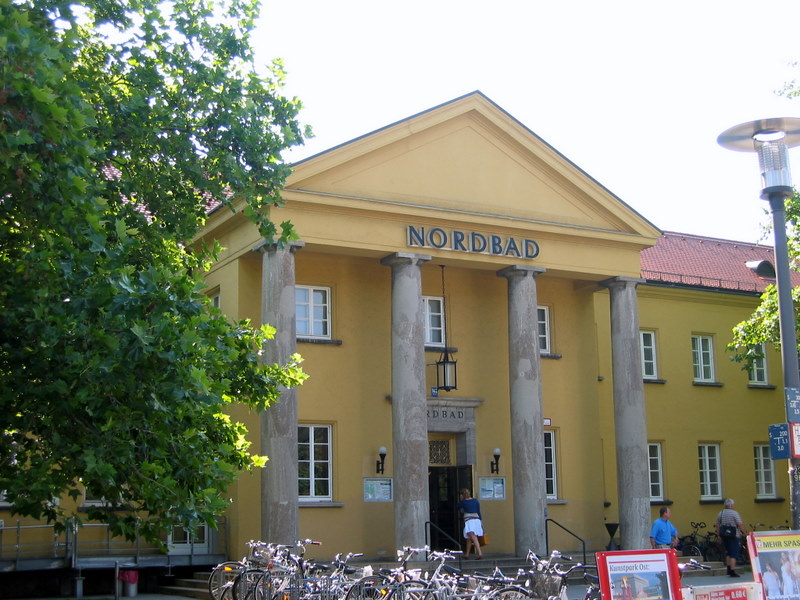
Nordbad

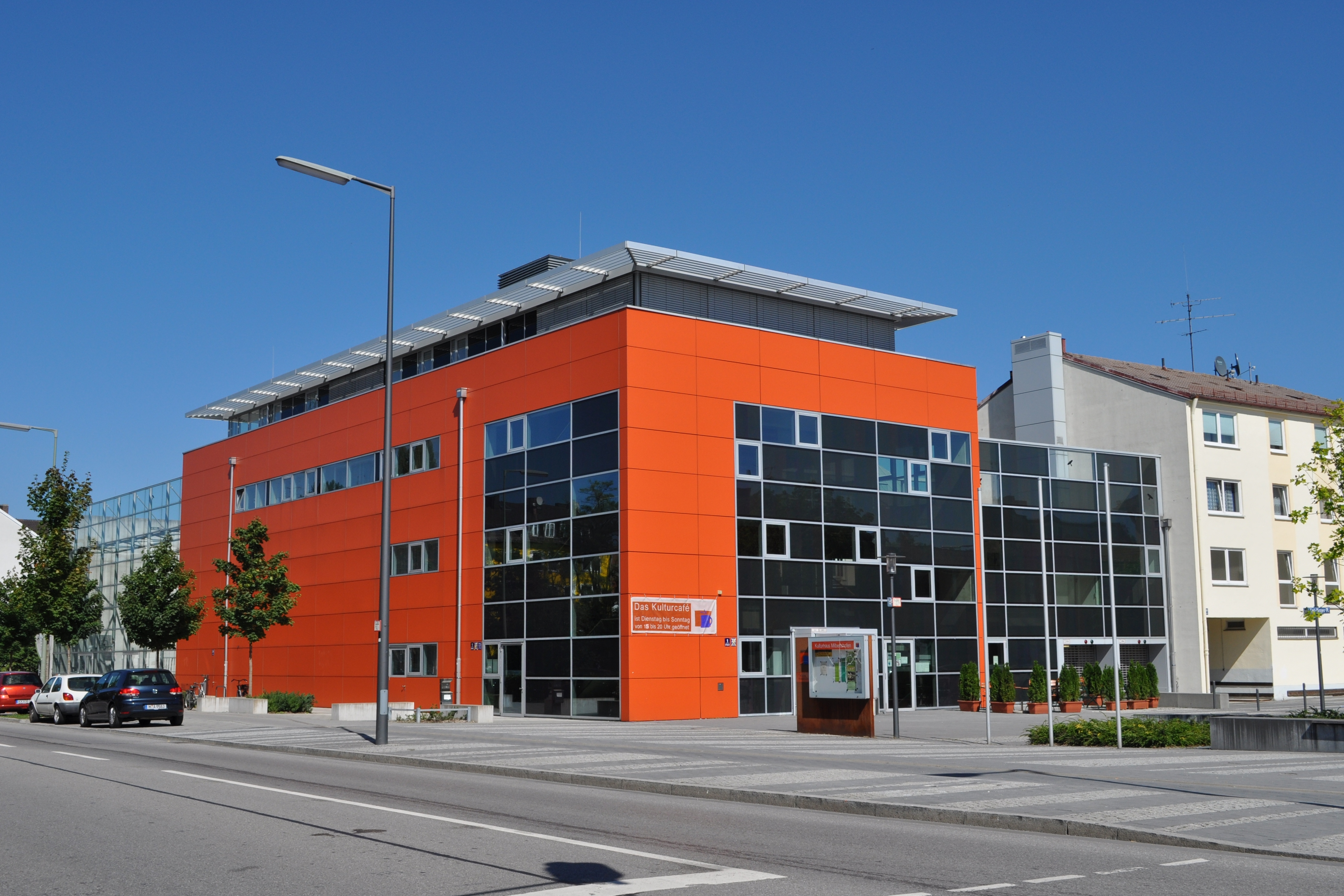
Culture House Milbertshofen

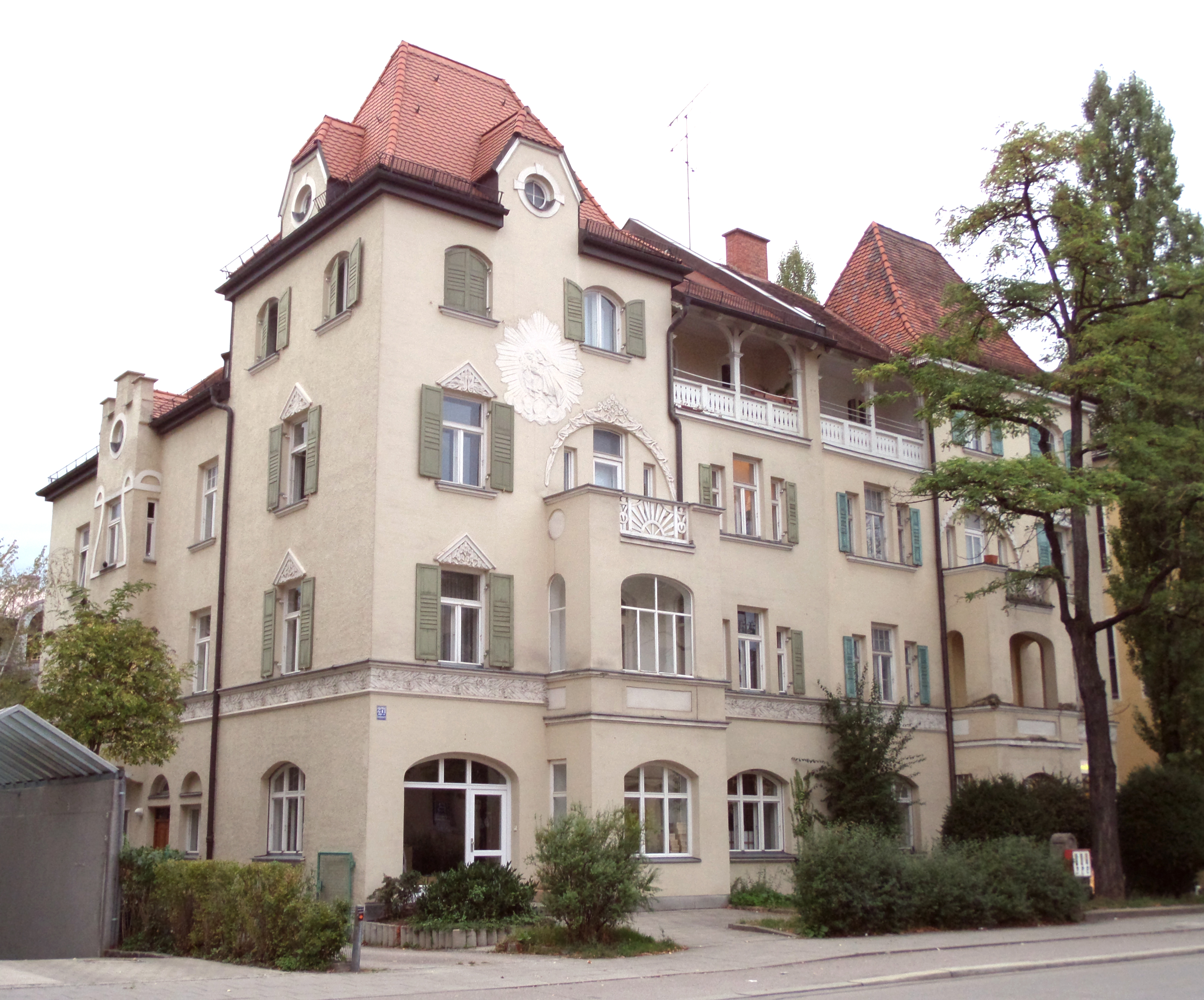
Schleißheimer Straße 271–273

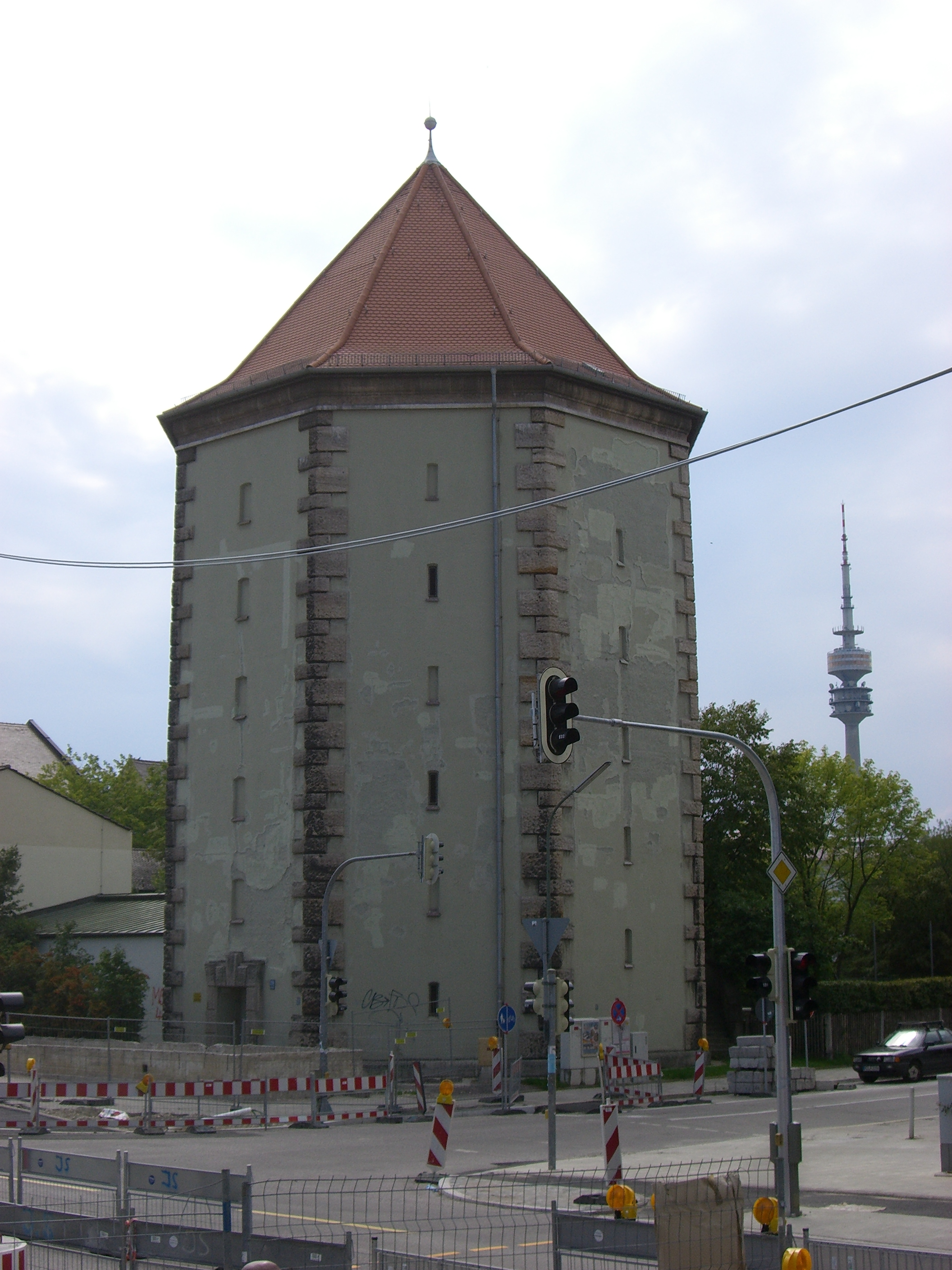
High bunker at Schleißheimer Straße 281

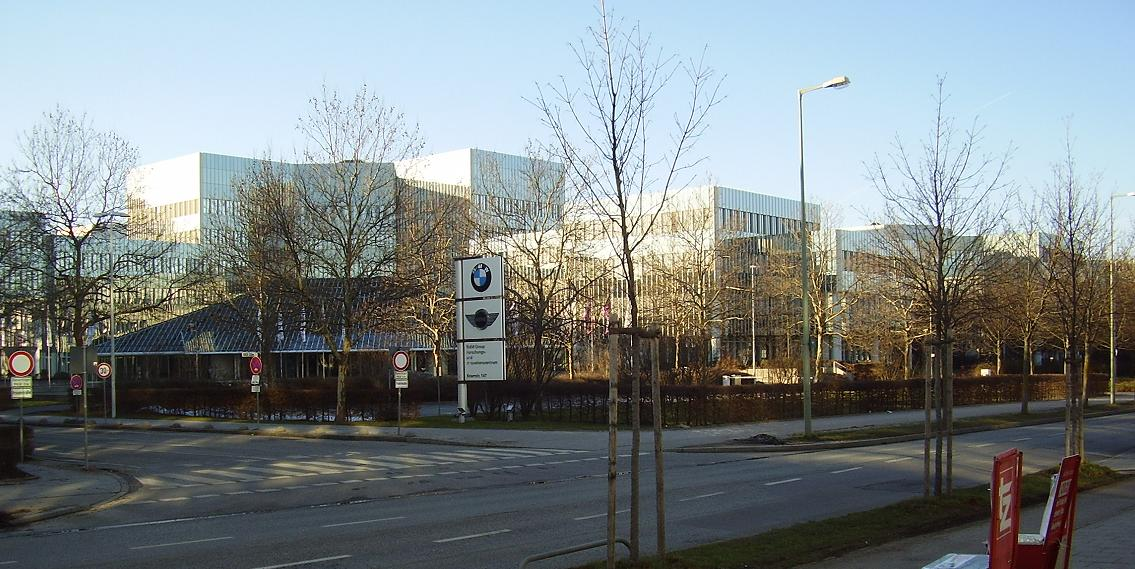
BMW FIZ

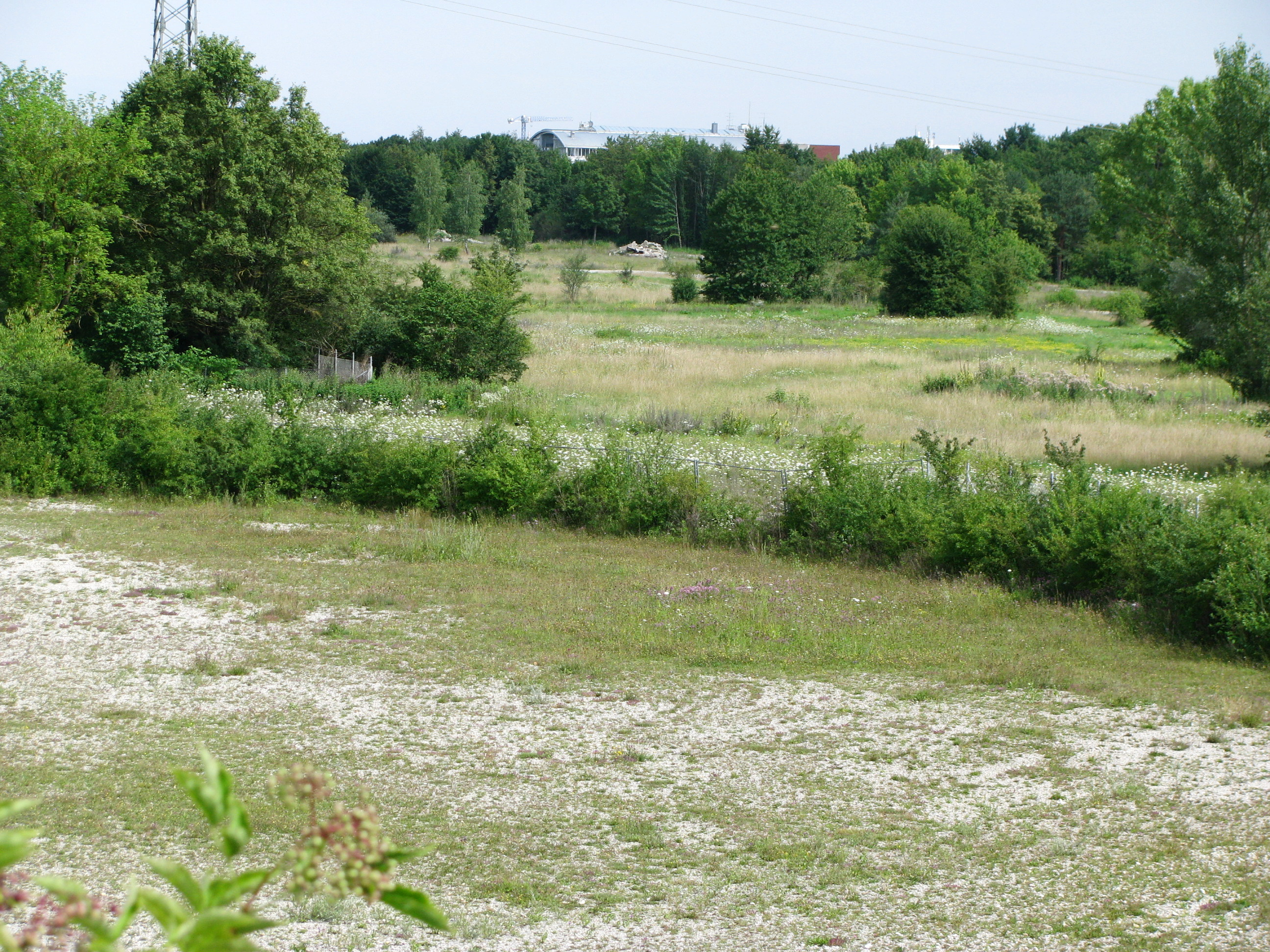
Virginia-Biotop

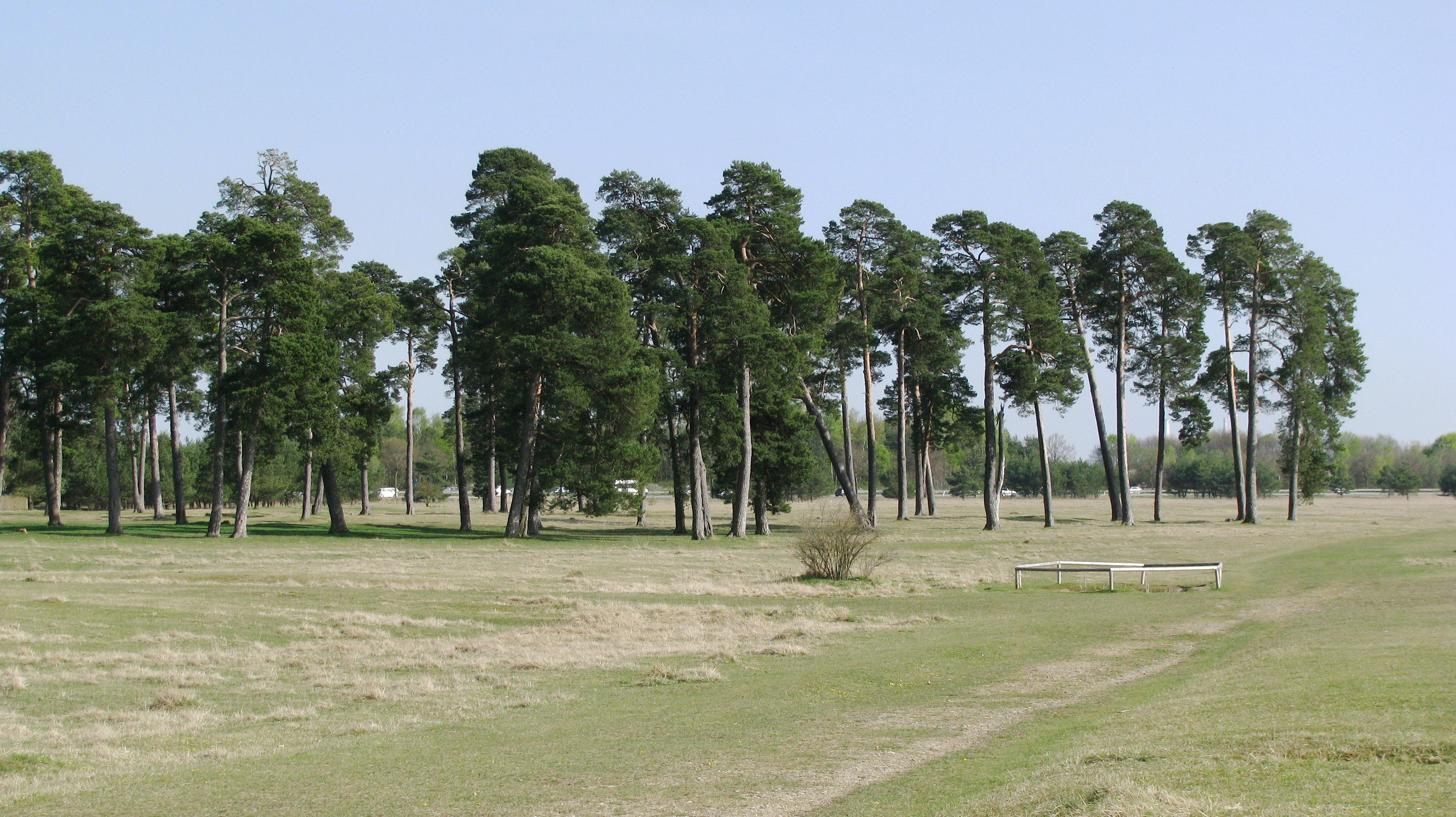
Panzerwiese

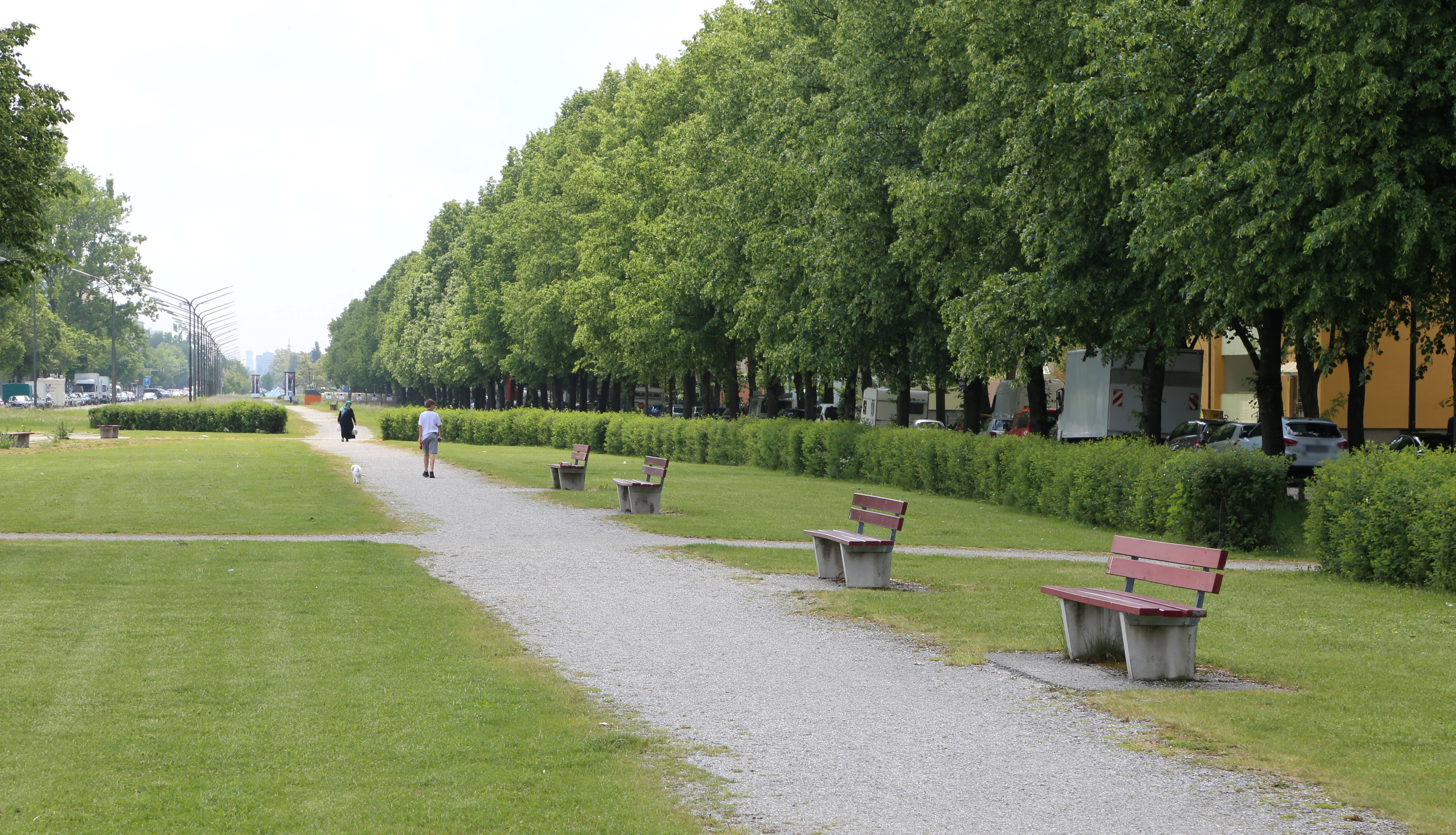
Fürstenachse at the end of Schleißheimer Straße in Hasenbergl

== History ==
The road originally followed the course of today's Lerchenauer Straße in the direction of Feldmoching/Schleißheim. Since the 14th century it was called Rennweg/Reitweg (riding trail). From the 17th century onwards, Schleißheimer Straße connected Munich with the summer residence of the Bavarian rulers in Schleissheim Palace. With the construction of the Oberschleißheim airfield in 1912, the road crossed the airfield and was permanently interrupted in 1917 after several near attacks. The Powder Tower was a well-known former meeting place of the Dark culture. It was closed on 1 January 2007 and has since been demolished. Between Nordbad and Petuelring, is the line 27 of the Munich tram, which runs on a section of the line 7 between Görresstraße and Petuelring, which was stopped in 1980 with the opening of the underground line U2. Until 1993, tram line 13 also ran on the section between Rathenaustraße and its end in Hasenbergl. This line was closed on 21 November 1993 as it was replaced by the underground line U2, which mostly ran parallel. The former Hasenbergl terminal was converted into a sport and play area.

Adolf Hitler lived in a room at Schleißheimer Straße 34 from May 1913 until he joined the Bavarian Army in August 1914.
