= München Neu Freimann =

München Neu Freimann is a post World War II displaced person camp in the American sector. The camp was located in Schwabing-Freimann and opened in July 1946. Residents were housed in confiscated workers' housing.
