= Hanns Goebl =

German sculptor

Old portrait photo of Hanns Goebl

Hanns Goebl (June 23, 1901 – August 12, 1986) was a Bavarian sculptor who worked for the Nymphenburg Porcelain Factory. During the 1930s and 1940s he produced several works of art for the Nazis.

Goebl was born in Munich. From 1924 to 1929 he was a student at the Academy of Fine Arts Munich where he studied under Joseph Wackerle. He then received a one-year fellowship at the Villa Massimo, the German art foundation in Rome. When he returned to Germany he joined the Nympenburg Porcelain Factory where he designed numerous small works, especially statues of soldiers. In 1932 his work was displayed at the Villa Romana, the German art foundation in Florence. In 1935 he was at the Prussian Academy of Sciences in Berlin. In 1940 and 1941 he was at the Kunsthalle Mannheim.

In 1941 he designed the Hoheitsadler, the Third Reich's coat of arms. He also sculpted a bust of Rudolf von Sebottendorf.
