= Feldmoching-Hasenbergl =

Borough of Munich, Germany

Coordinates: 48.2111°N 11.5417°E

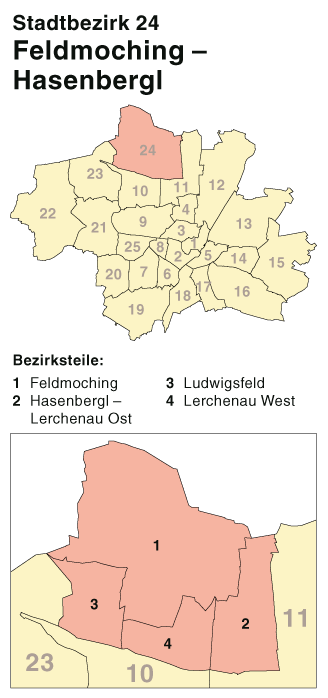
Location of Feldmoching-Hasenbergl in Munich

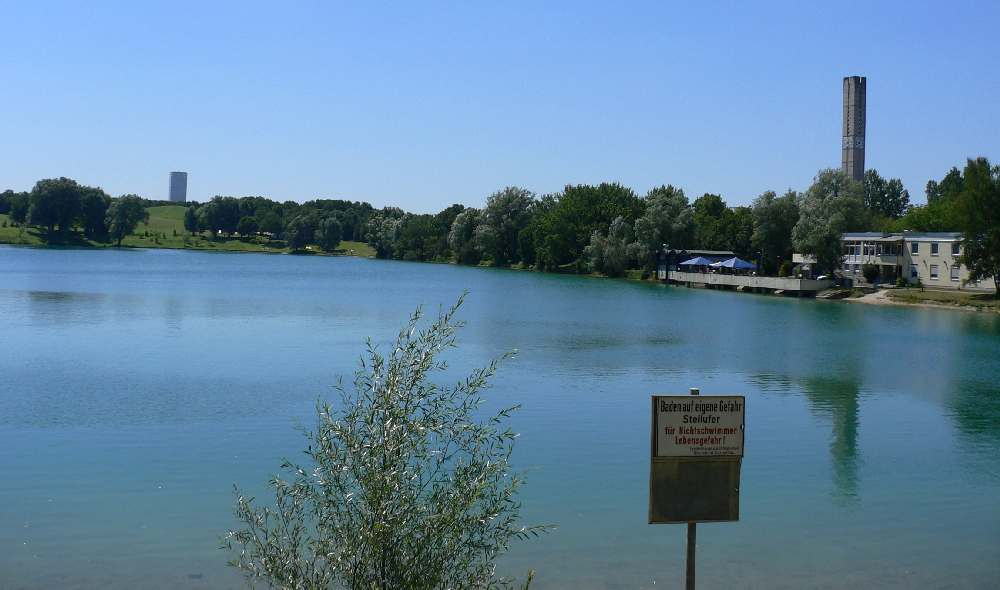
Lerchenauer See

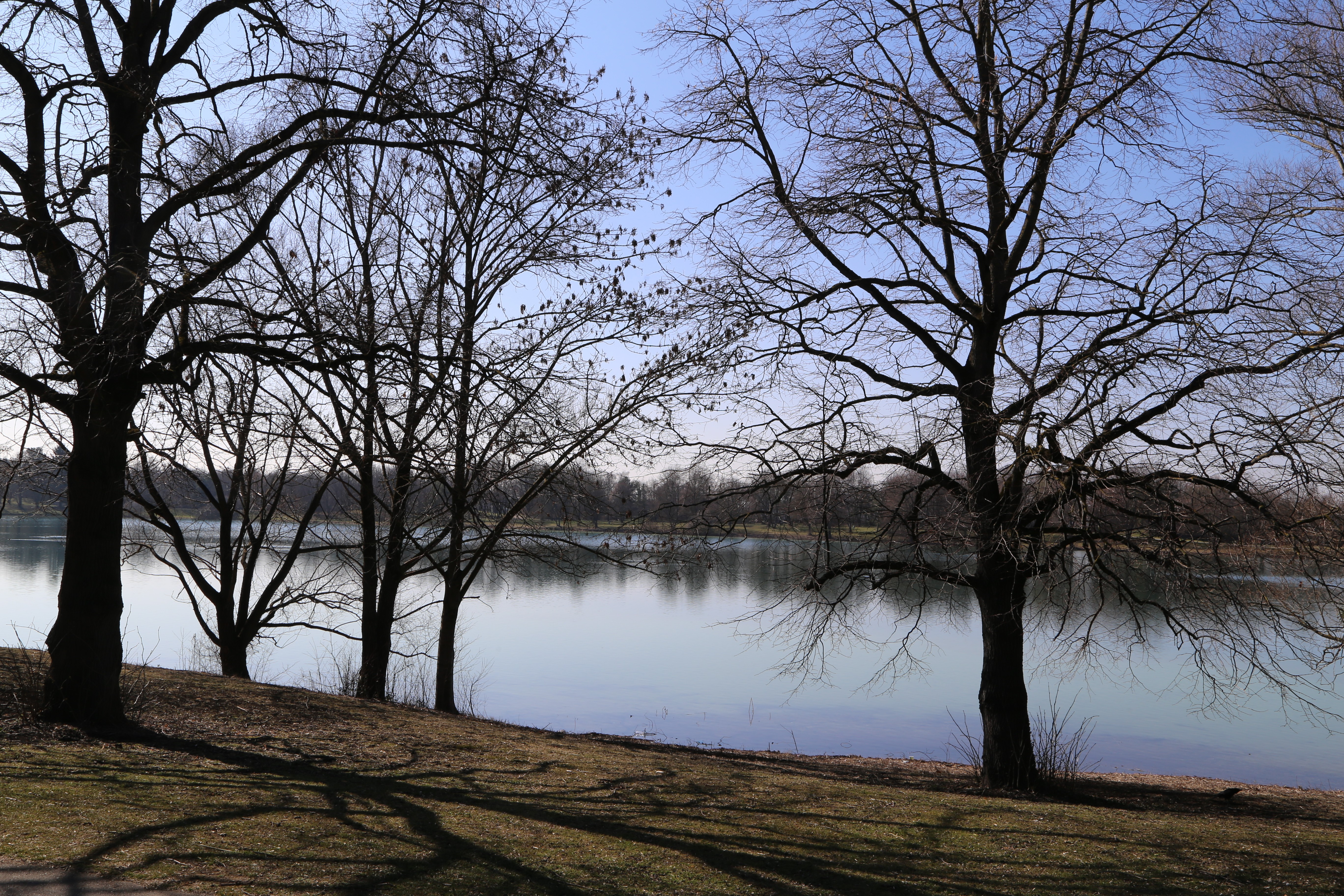
Fasaneriesee

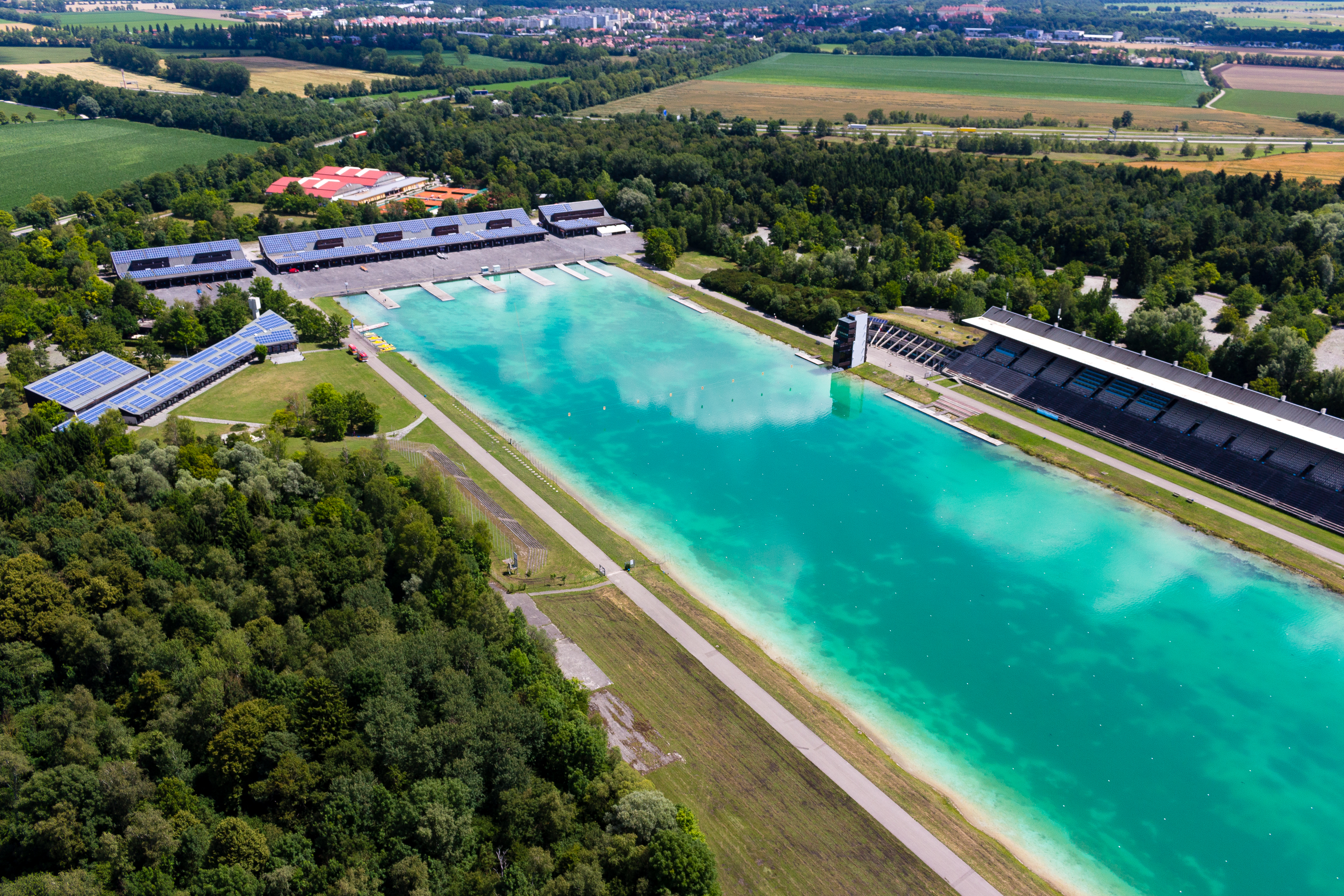
Regatta course

Feldmoching-Hasenbergl (German pronunciation: [ˈfɛltˌmɔxɪŋ ˈhaːzn̩ˌbɛʁgl̩]; Central Bavarian: Fejdmoching-Hosnbeagl) is the northernmost borough of the city of Munich in Bavaria, Germany. It contains the S-Bahn railway station of Munich-Feldmoching station.

== Location ==
Feldmoching-Hasenbergl is surrounded by: Allach-Untermenzing, Moosach and Milbertshofen-Am Hart in the south, and Karlsfeld and Oberschleißheim in the north.

== Description ==
It contains four lakes, the Lerchenauer See, Fasaneriesee, Feldmochinger See (Dreiseenplatte) and Landschaftssee Allacher Lohe as well as part of the Oberschleißheim regatta course. Green areas include Panzerwiese, Schwarzhölzl and Hartelholz.
