= Mark-Twain-Straße =

Street in Munich, Germany

- formerly Kirchenstraße
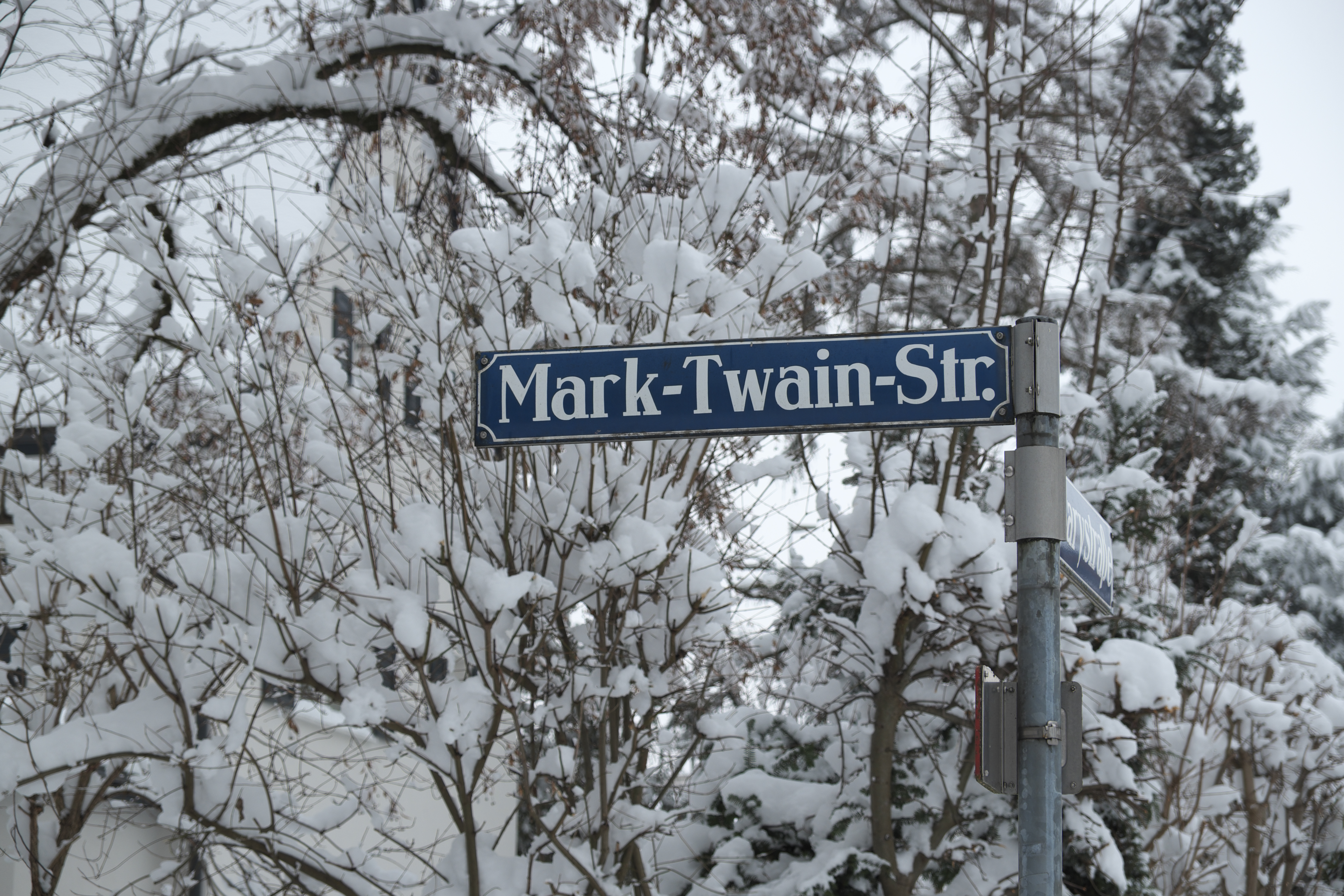

- Location within Germany
- Namesake: Mark Twain
- Length: 1,300 m (4,300 ft)
- Location: Munich
- Postal code: 81245
- Nearest metro station: Munich Pasing station (S6)
- Coordinates: 48.136604°N 11.537229°E
- Major junctions: Alte Allee, Lipperheidestraße, Barystraße

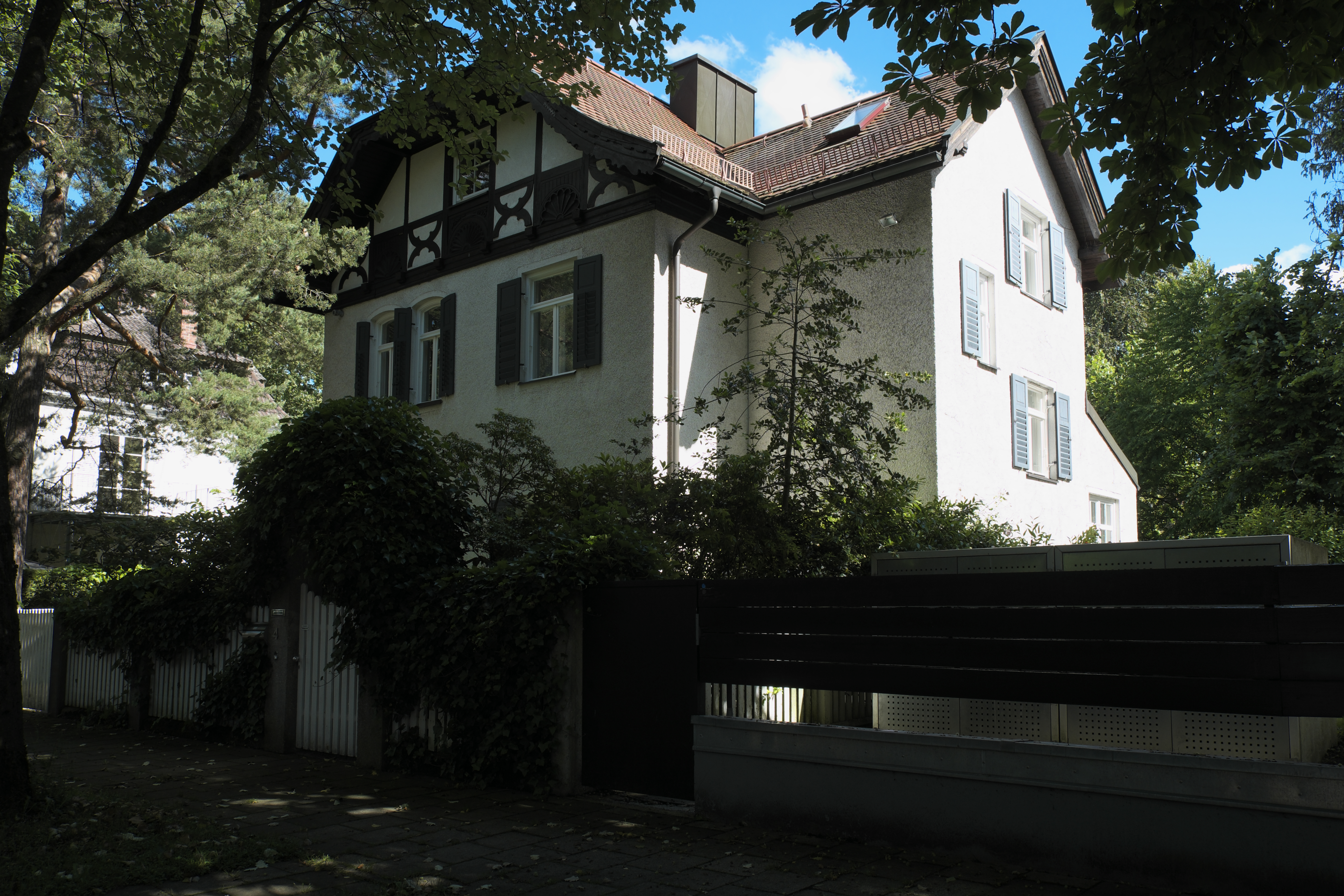
Villa Mark-Twain-Straße 4

The Mark-Twain-Straße is a street in the Munich district Pasing-Obermenzing, which was built around 1900. It was named in 1947 after the American writer Mark Twain (1835–1910).

== History ==
Originally called Kirchenstraße, the street connects Alte Allee with Barystraße. It belonged to the extension planning of the Villenkolonie Pasing II between Alter Allee and Pippinger Straße, which to this day was not carried out. Between Barystraße 10 and 12 there is an undeveloped property owned by the city of Munich, so that the Mark-Twain-Straße can be extended at any time in the direction of Pippinger Straße.

Until the First World War, only two villas were built on Mark-Twain- Straße, No. 2 and 4. The complete development of the alley laid out street happened in recent decades.

== Historical monuments ==
- Mark-Twain-Straße 4
