= Boroughs of Munich =

Divisions of the German city

Since the administrative reform in 1992, Munich (German: München) has been divided into 25 boroughs or Stadtbezirke:

Boroughs since the administrative reform in 1992:
1. Altstadt-Lehel
2. Ludwigsvorstadt-Isarvorstadt
3. Maxvorstadt
4. Schwabing-West
5. Au-Haidhausen
6. Sendling
7. Sendling-Westpark
8. Schwanthalerhöhe
9. Neuhausen-Nymphenburg
10. Moosach
11. Milbertshofen-Am Hart
12. Schwabing-Freimann
13. Bogenhausen
14. Berg am Laim
15. Trudering-Riem
16. Ramersdorf-Perlach
17. Obergiesing
18. Untergiesing-Harlaching
19. Thalkirchen-Obersendling-Forstenried-Fürstenried-Solln
20. Hadern
21. Pasing-Obermenzing
22. Aubing-Lochhausen-Langwied
23. Allach-Untermenzing
24. Feldmoching-Hasenbergl
25. Laim
Before the administrative reform, Munich was divided into 41 boroughs:

1. Altstadt
1. (alt) Max-Joseph-Platz
2. (alt) Angerviertel
3. (alt) Sendlinger Straße
4. (alt) City-Bezirk
5. Maxvorstadt - Universitätsviertel
6. Maxvorstadt - Königsplatz
7. Maxvorstadt - Josephsplatz
8. Marsfeld
9. Wiesenviertel
10. Isarvorstadt - Schlachthausviertel
11. Isarvorstadt - Glockenbachviertel
12. Isarvorstadt - Deutsches Museum
13. Lehel
14. Haidhausen
14. (alt) Haidhausen
15. (alt) Haidhausen-Süd
16. Au
17. Obergiesing
  1. Altobergiesing
  2. Fasangarten
18. Untergiesing-Harlaching
  1. Untergiesing
  2. Harlaching
19. Sendling
20. Schwanthalerhöhe
21. Neuhausen - Oberwiesenfeld
22. Schwabing - Freimann
  1. Schwabing-Ost
  2. Freimann - Alte Heide
23. Neuhausen - Nymphenburg
  1. östlich
  2. westlich
24. Thalkirchen - Obersendling - Forstenried
  1. Thalkirchen - Prinz-Ludwigs-Höhe
  2. Obersendling
  3. Forstenried - Fürstenried
25. Laim
26. Schwabing - West
27. Milbertshofen - Am Hart
  1. Schwabing-Nord
  2. Milbertshofen
  3. Am Hart
28. Neuhausen - Moosach
  1. Äußere Dachauer Straße
  2. Moosach
29. Bogenhausen
  1. Bogenhausen
  2. Oberföhring
  3. Daglfing - Denning
30. Ramersdorf - Perlach
  1. Ramersdorf
  2. Perlach und Neuperlach
  3. Waldperlach
31. Berg am Laim
32. Trudering
  1. Alttrudering - Riem
  2. Gartenstadt Trudering
  3. Waldtrudering
33. Feldmoching - Hasenbergl
  1. Feldmoching
  2. Harthhof - Lerchenau - Hasenbergl
  3. Ludwigsfeld
34. Waldfriedhofviertel
35. Pasing
  1. Villenkolonie I und II
  2. Alt-Pasing
36. Solln
37. Obermenzing
38. Allach - Untermenzing
  1. Allach
  2. Untermenzing
39. Aubing
  1. Aubing
  2. Neuaubing
40. Lochhausen - Langwied
  1. südlich der Bahnlinie
  2. nördlich der Bahnlinie
41. Hadern

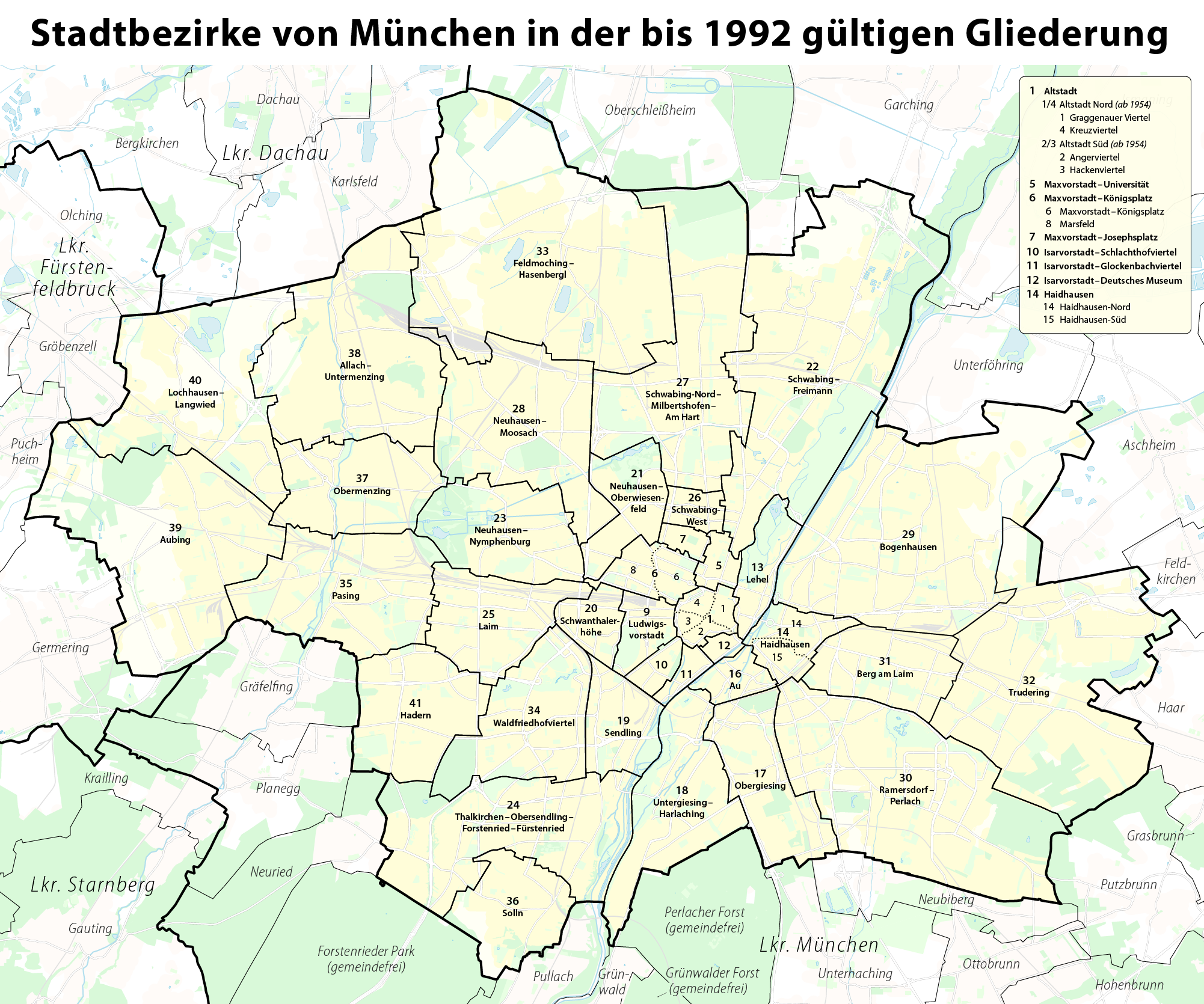
The boroughs of Munich until 1992
