= Barystraße =

Street in Munich, Germany

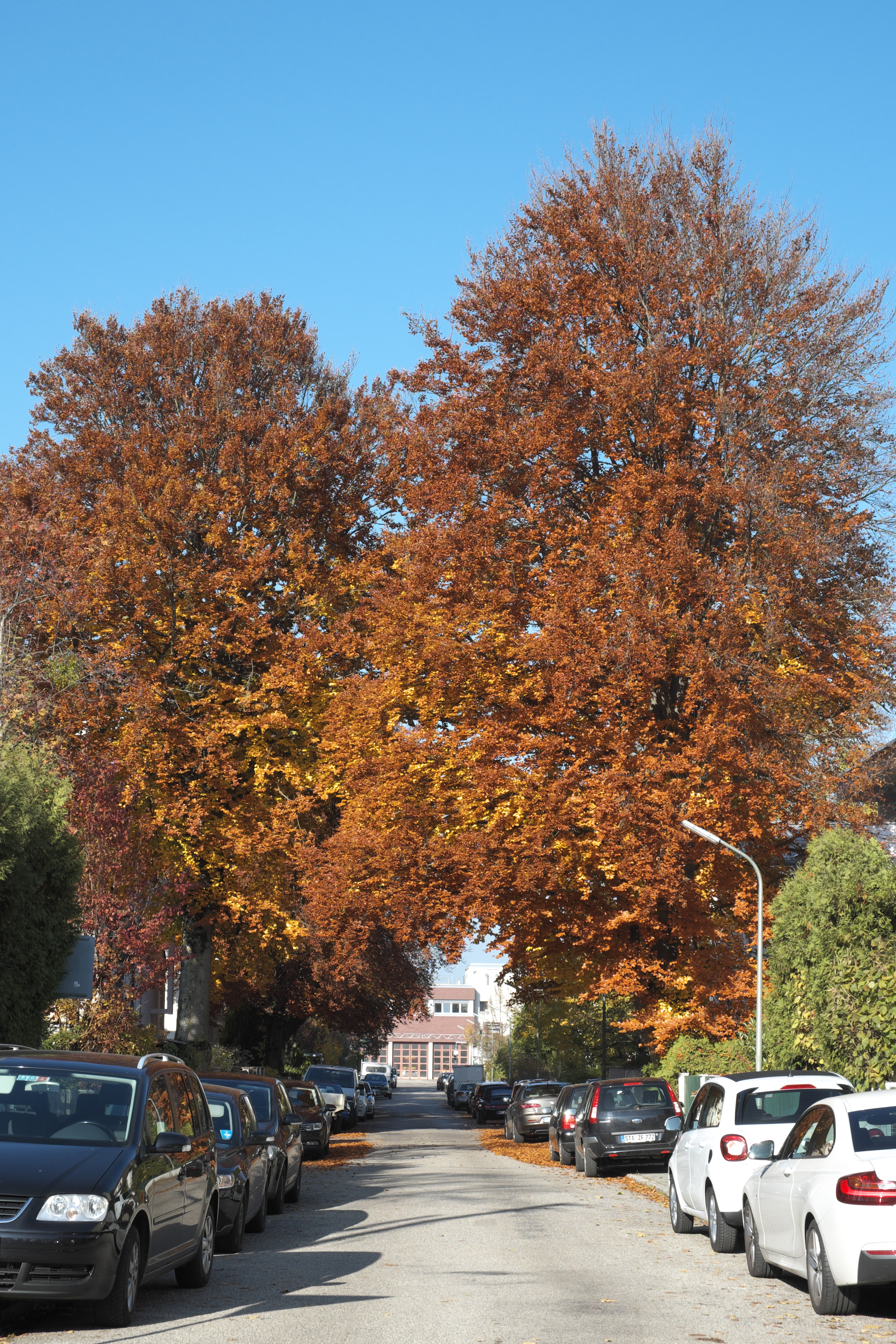
Barystraße in Munich (October 2015)

Barystraße is a street in Munich's Obermenzing district, which was built around 1897. It was named after the doctor and opera singer Alfred von Bary (1873-1926).

== History ==
The street, originally named Kleiststraße, connects the Alte Allee through Bassermannstraße. It was crossed around 1897 with the junction of the Mark-Twain-Straße. It belonged to the expansion planning of the Villenkolonie Pasing II, between Alte Allee and Pippinger Straße, which has not been implemented to this day. The development with villas at the beginning of the street took place until the World War I, the extension to Bassermannstraße took place after the World War II. The construction was completed in 2015.

== Historical buildings ==
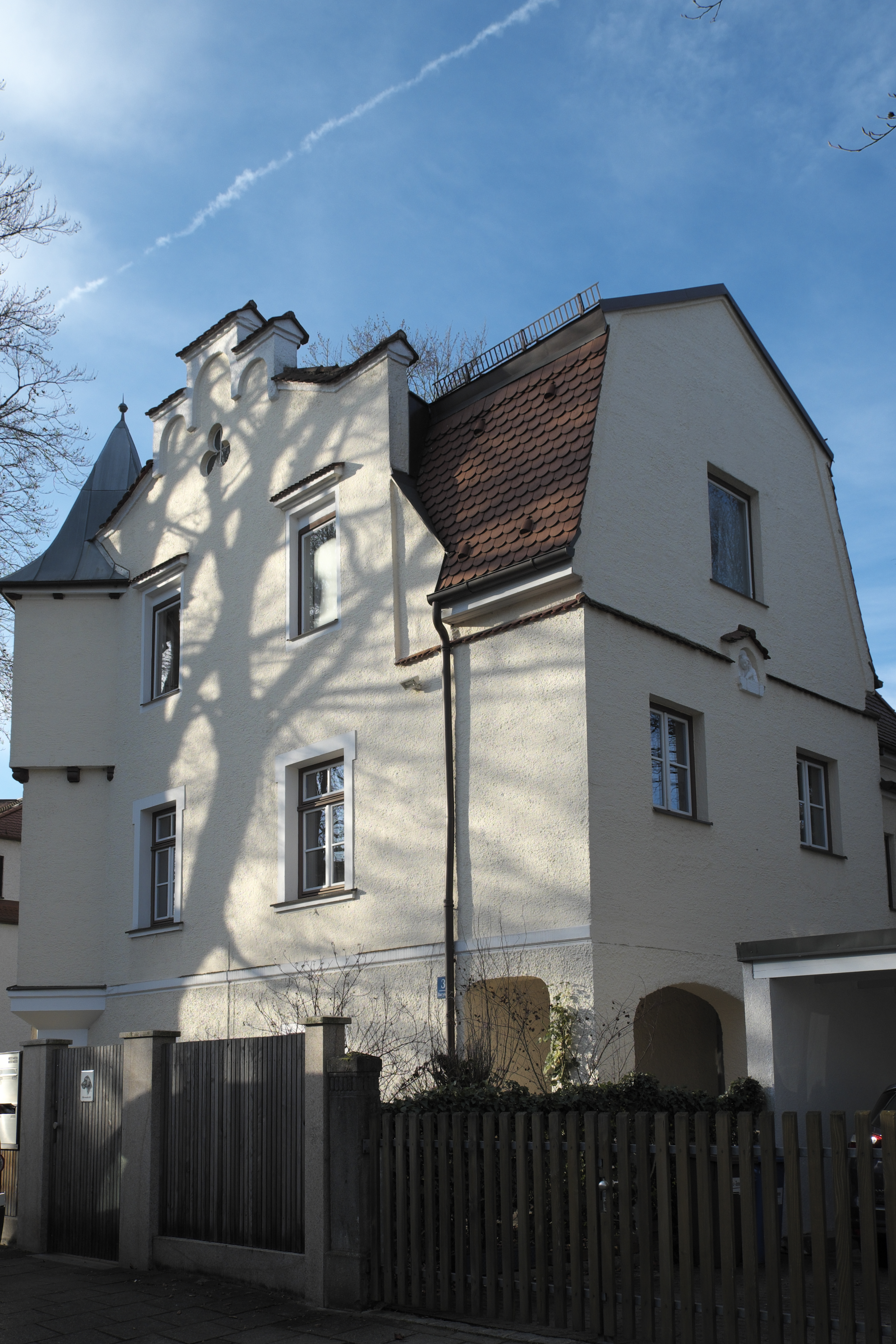
Villa Barystraße 3

The buildings, Barystraße 2, 3 and 5, belong to the building group Villenkolonie Pasing II, which is under cultural heritage management. The Villa Barystraße 3 is also under monument protection as a singular object.

== Literature ==
- Dennis A. Chevalley, Timm Weski: Landeshauptstadt München – Südwest (= Bavarian State Office for Monument Protection [ed.]: Denkmäler in Bayern. Vol. I.2/2). Karl M. Lipp Verlag, Munich 2004, ISBN 3-87490-584-5, p. 95.
