= Rembrandtstraße =

Street in Munich, Germany

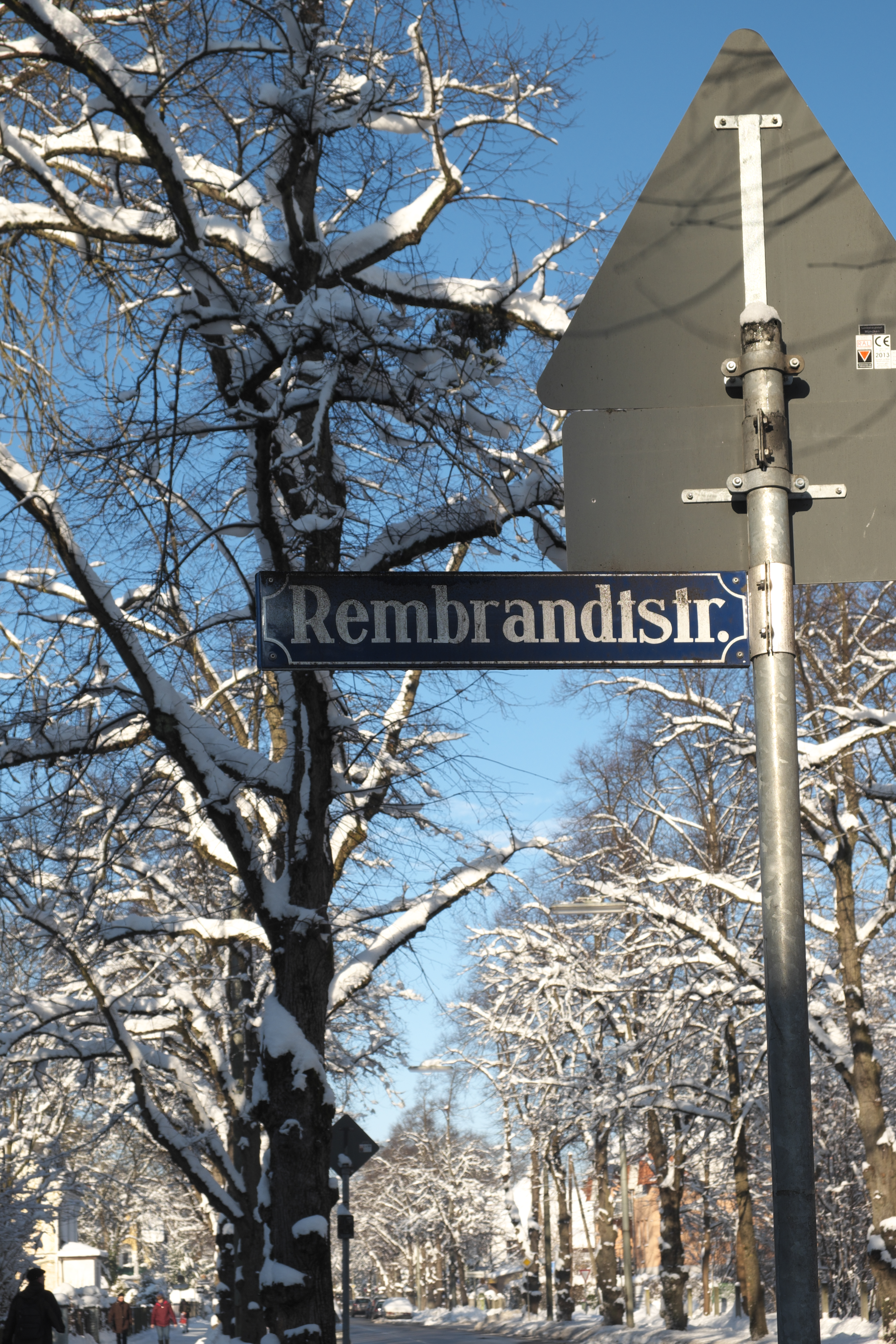

The Rembrandtstraße, named after the painter Rembrandt van Rijn, is a street in the Munich district of Pasing, which was built around 1900.

== History ==
The street, originally called I. Apfelallee, is a west-oriented street of the Villenkolonie Pasing II, which connects the Alte Allee to Marschnerstraße. First the Rembrandtstraße was only sporadically built up with villas. The largest vacant lots were filled after 1910 with two row house groups (No. 10-32 and No. 15-21) by Bernhard Borst. On the north side, the large garden plot of Villa Riemerschmid (Lützowstraße 11) creates a vacant lot.

In the spring of 2016 the street received a new bitumen cover, the walkways are still only cobblestone or green.

== Historical buildings ==
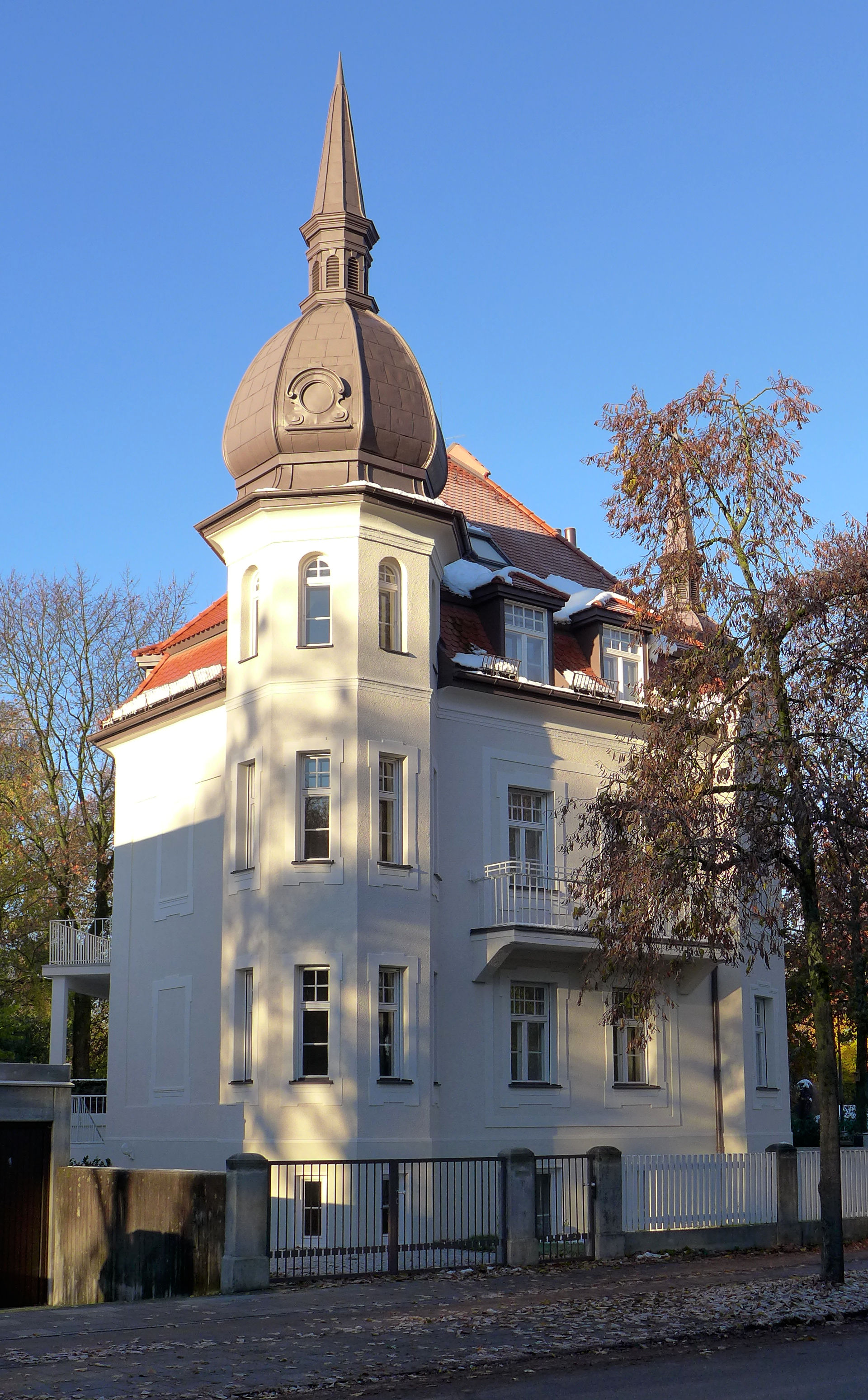
Double Villa No. 1 and 3

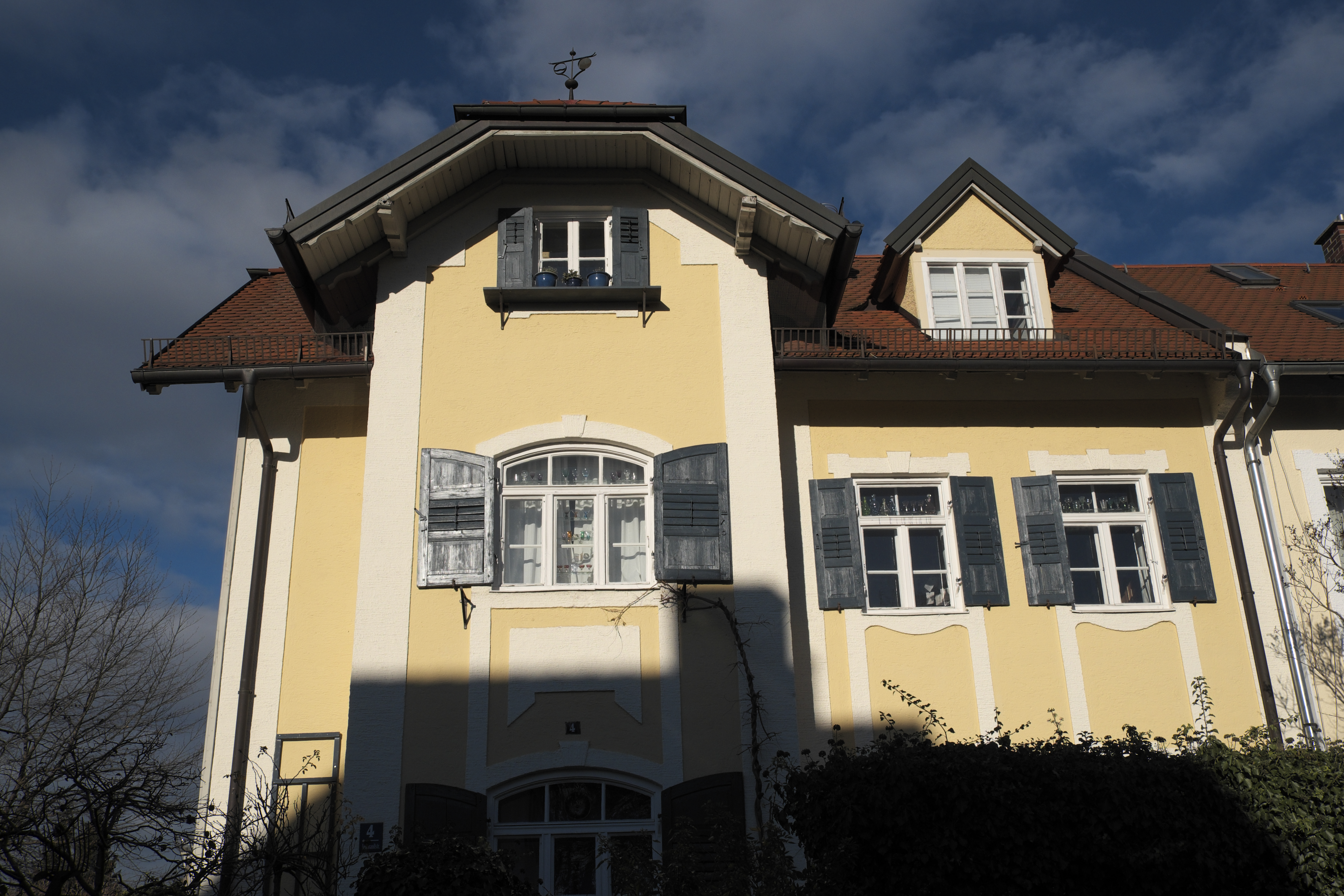
Rembrandtstraße 4

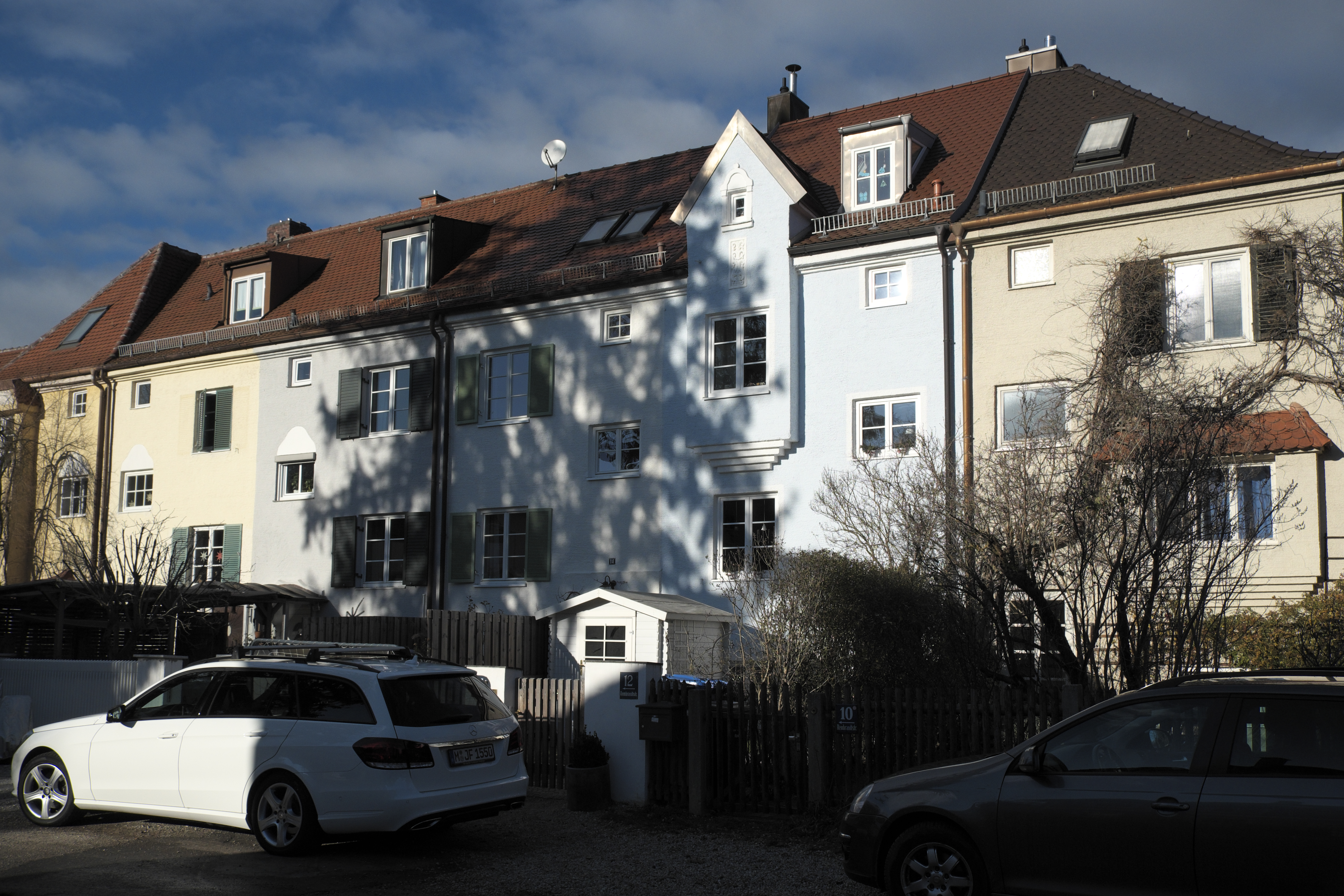
Row house group, No. 10-32
- Rembrandtstraße 1 (Double villa with No. 3)
- Rembrandtstraße 2 (Semi-detached house with no. 4)
- Rembrandtstraße 3 (Double villa with number 1)
- Rembrandtstraße 4 (Semi-detached house with no. 2)
- Rembrandtstraße 6 (Villa)
- Rembrandtstraße 7 (Villa)
- Rembrandtstraße 13 (Villa)

== Well-known residents ==
Rembrandtstraße 4: The art educator and president of the Academy of Fine Arts, Munich, Rudolf Seitz, lived in House No. 4, until his death in April 2001. Now the Rudi-Seitz-Archiv is located there.

Rembrandtstraße 6: The landscape painter, Fritz Baer, built the villa with a studio in 1901.
