= Rubensstraße (Munich) =

Street in Munich, Germany

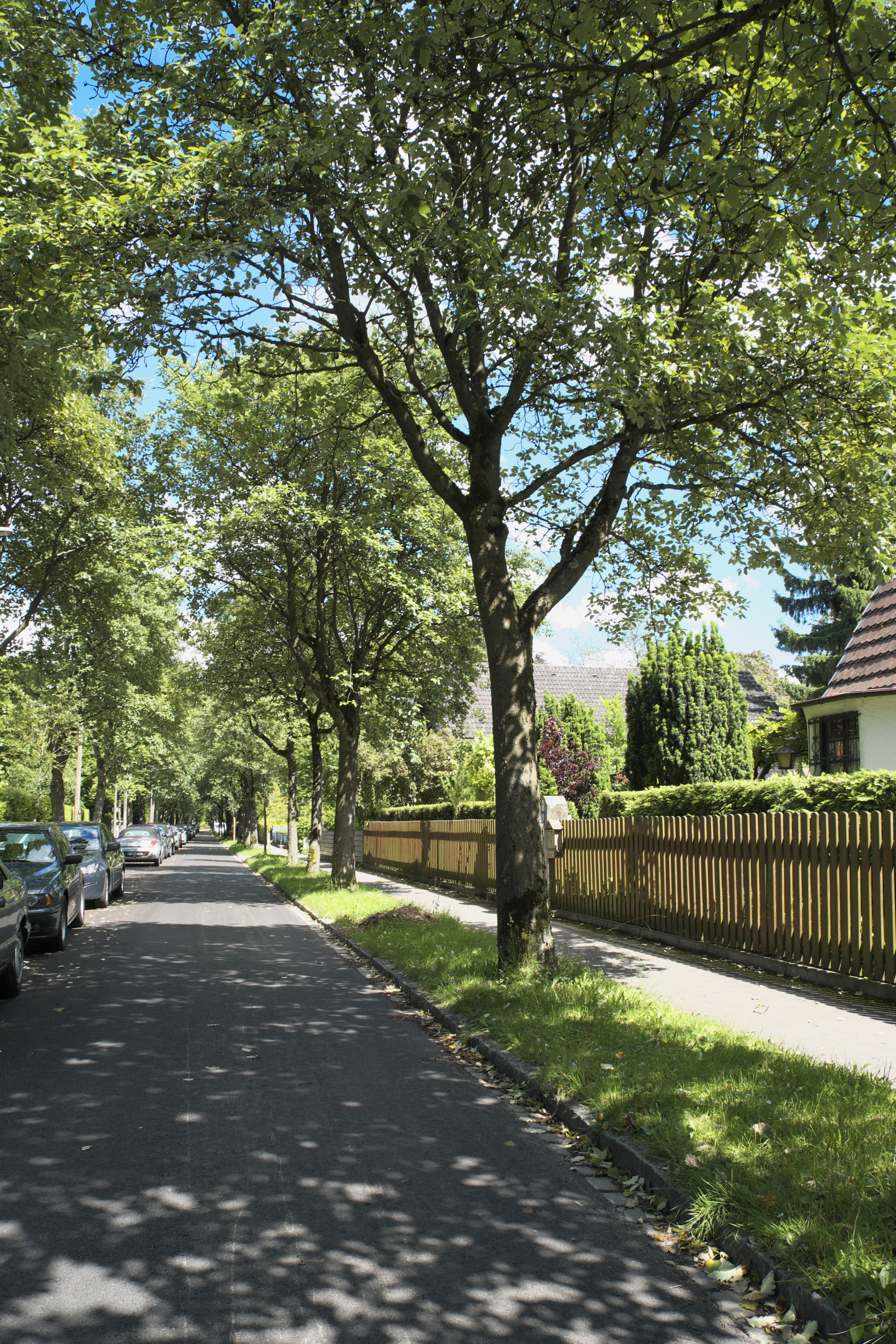
München-Obermenzing Rubensstraße

Rubensstraße, named after the painter Peter Paul Rubens (1577–1640), is a street in Munich's Obermenzing district, which was built around 1897.

== History ==
The originally named V. Apfelallee road, is a west-east oriented street of the Villenkolonie Pasing II, which connects the Alte Allee with the Marschnerstraße. Rubensstraße, was first made up of a few single-family houses constructed between 1900 and the First World War. In the last decades, the open land areas have been filled with the construction of rental housing blocks.

In spring 2016, the road received a new bitumen cover.

== Historical buildings ==
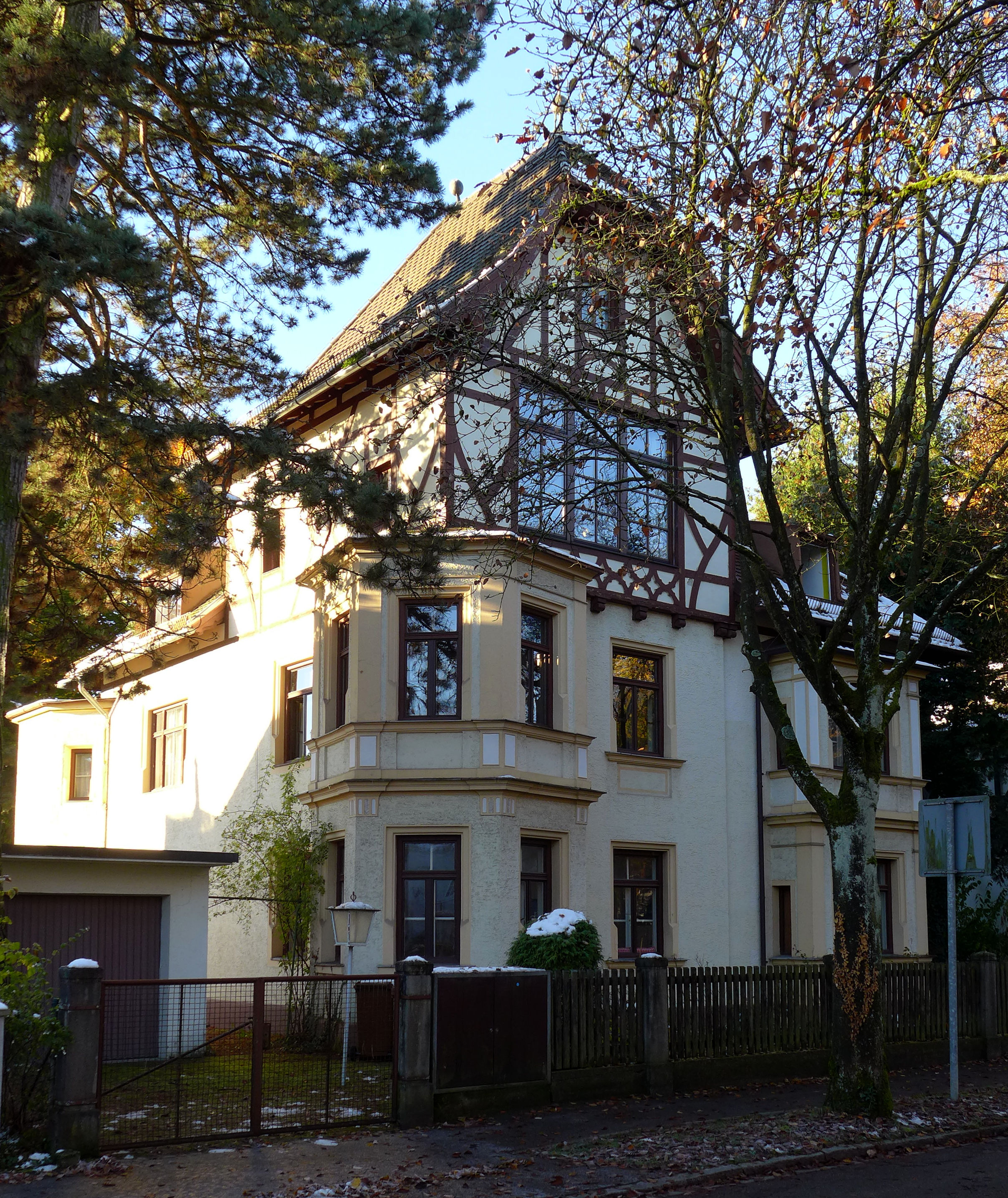
Rubensstraße 1

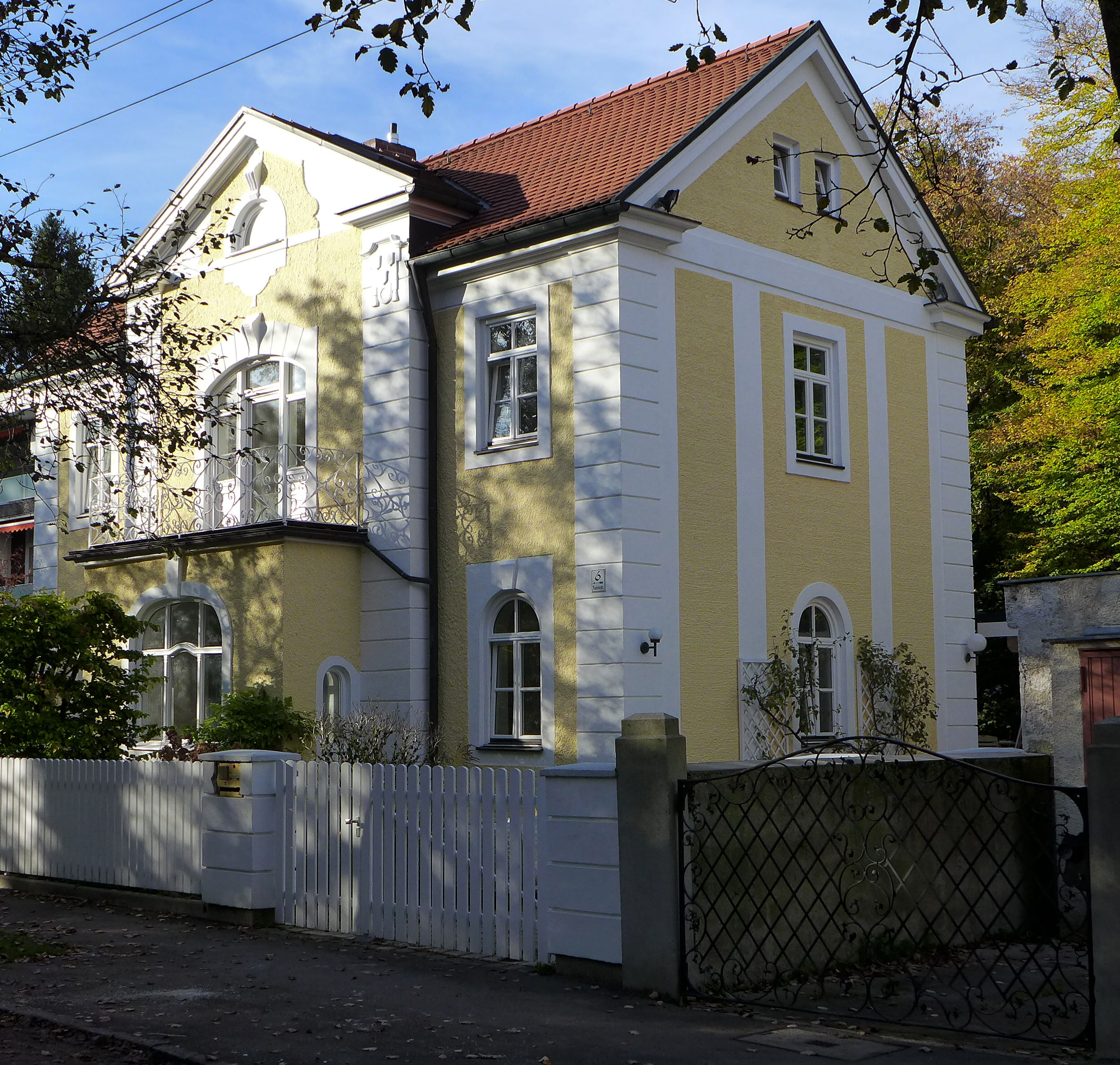
Rubensstraße 6

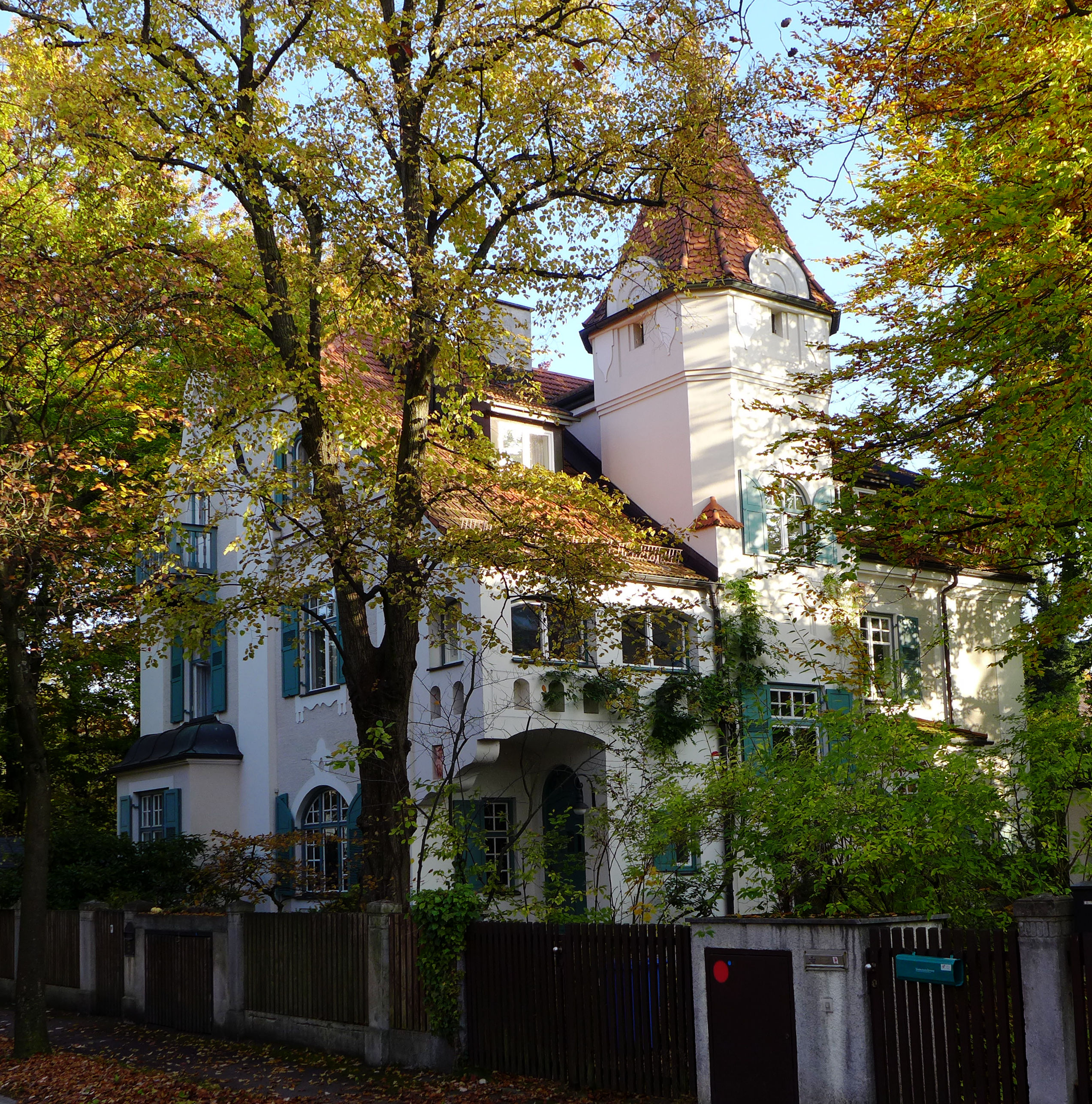
Rubensstraße 17

== Well-known residents ==
Rubensstraße 1: The villa was built for the painter and sculptor Georg Mattes. It served as a dwelling-house and studio.
