= Hofmillerstraße =

Street in Munich, Germany

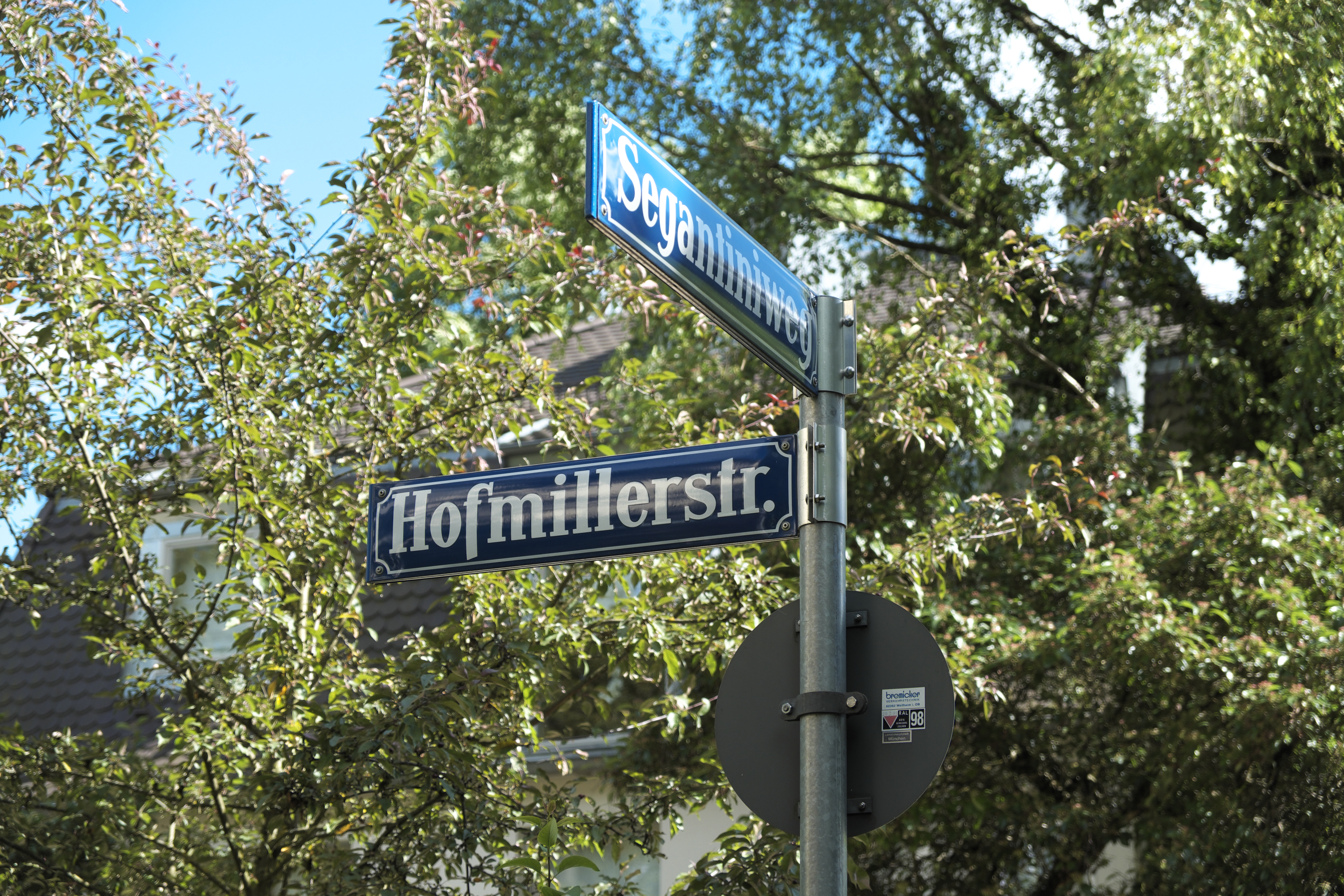

The Hofmillerstraße, named after the critic and translator, Josef Hofmiller (1872–1933), is a street in the Munich district of Obermenzing that was developed around 1897.

== History ==
Originally called IV. Apfelallee, the street runs west in the Villenkolonie Pasing II, and connects Alte Allee with Marschnerstraße. Until the First World War, Hofmillerstraße was initially developed with a sparse arrangement of single-family houses. In recent decades, the remaining vacant lots have been filled with apartment blocks.

In spring 2016, the road was resurfaced with bitumen.

== Historical buildings ==
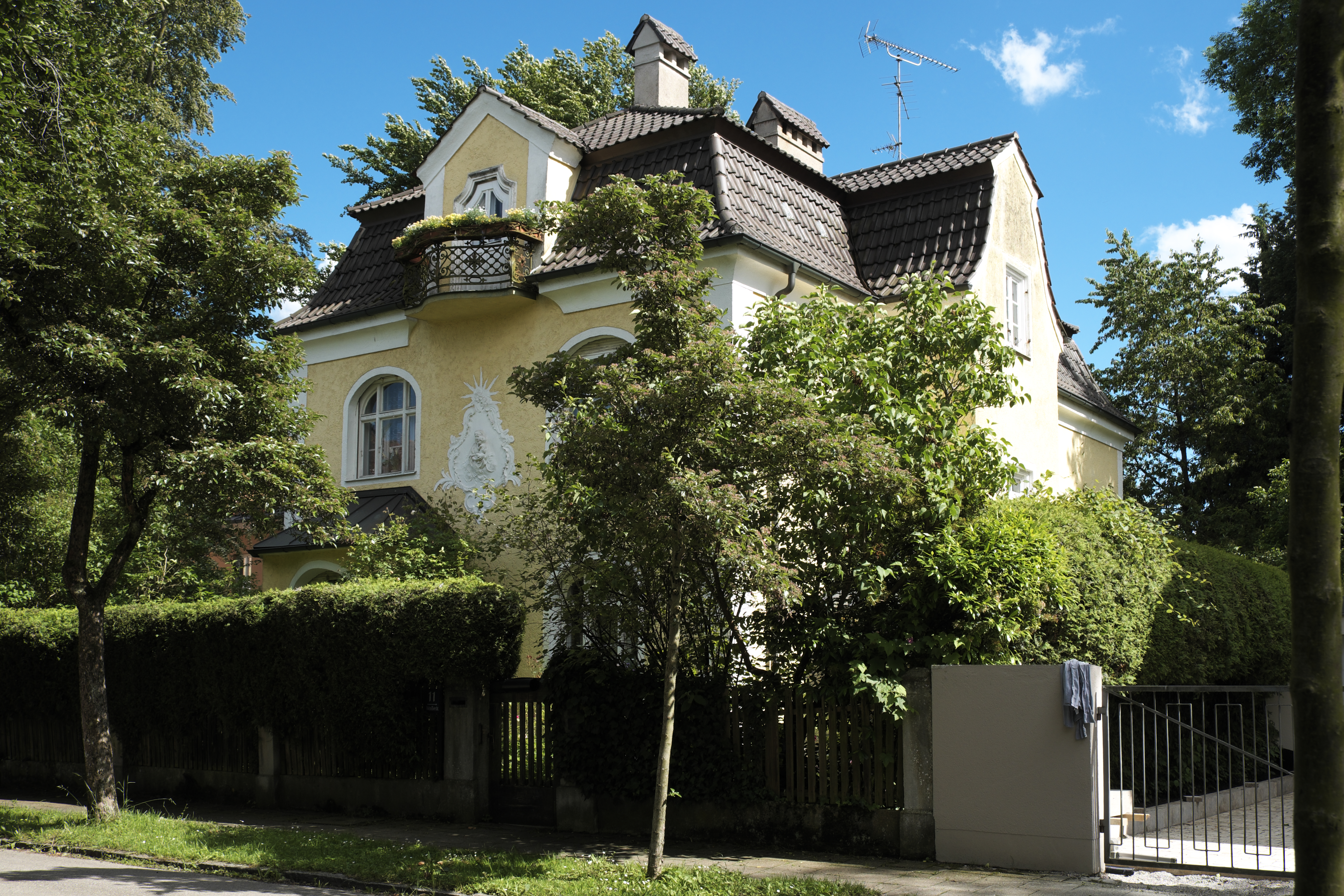
Hofmillerstraße 11

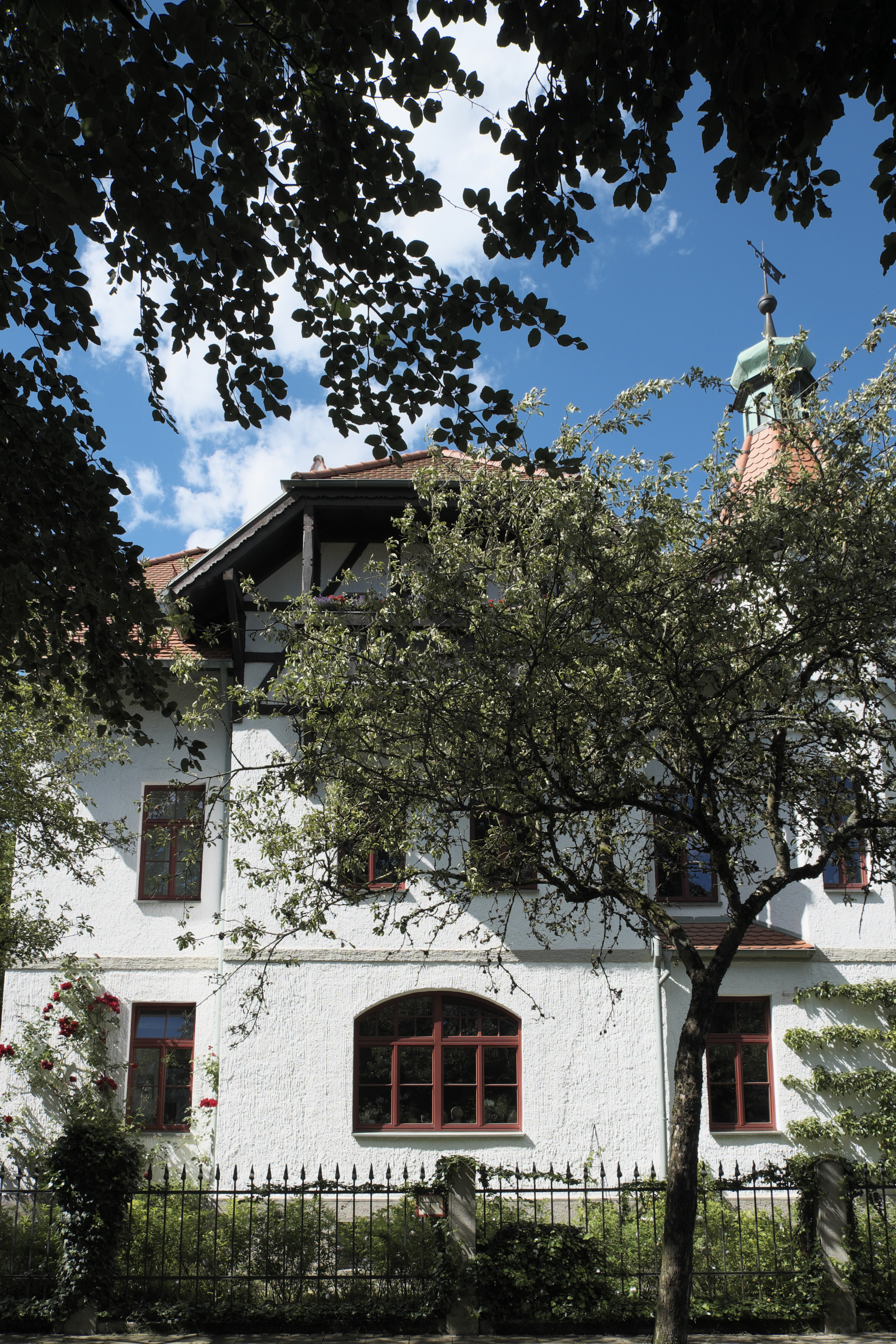
Hofmillerstraße 26

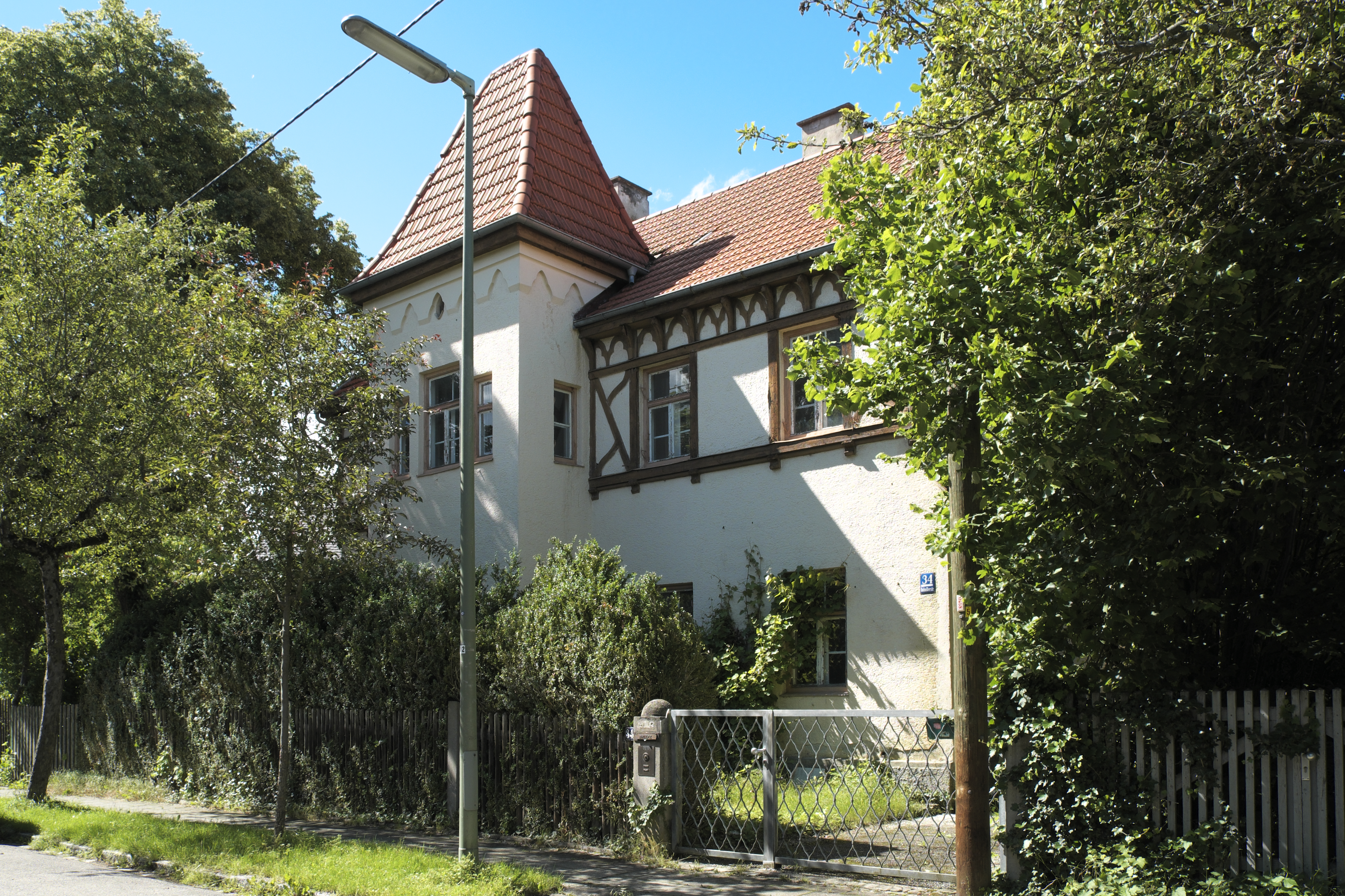
Hofmillerstraße 34
- Hofmillerstraße 4 (Villa)
- Hofmillerstraße 11 (Villa)
- Hofmillerstraße 26 (Villa)
- Hofmillerstraße 30 (Villa)
- Hofmillerstraße 32 (Villa)
- Hofmillerstraße 34 (Villa)
