= Apfelallee =

Street in Munich, Germany

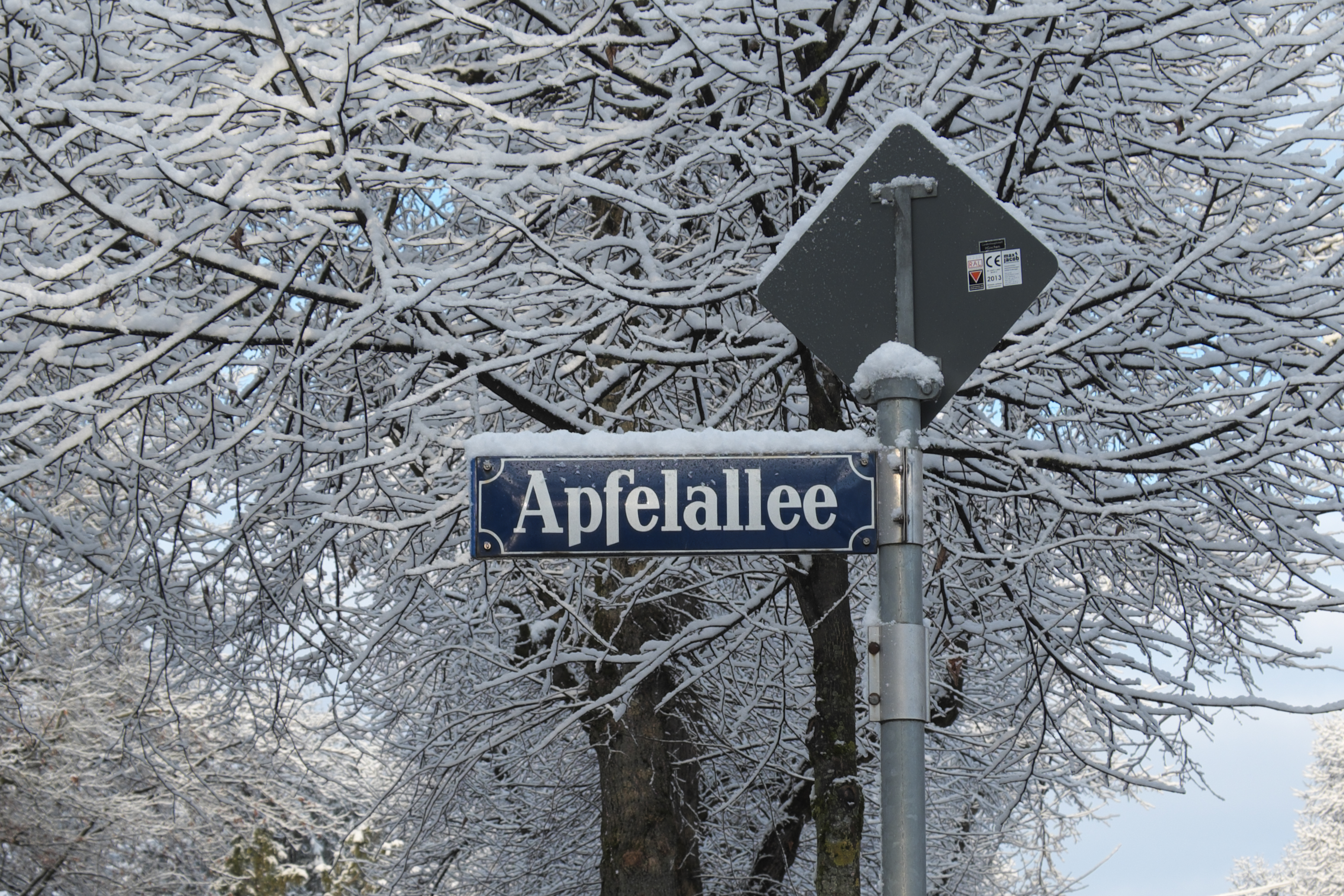

The Apfelallee is an avenue in the Munich district of Obermenzing, which was created around 1897.

== History ==
The Apfelallee is a west-east oriented crossroad of the Villenkolonie Pasing II, which emanates from the Alte Allee. On its south side, it was built up with historical villas. These are mostly kept in country house style and have wooden components. The north side is made up of modern and younger houses.

== Historical buildings on the Apfelallee ==
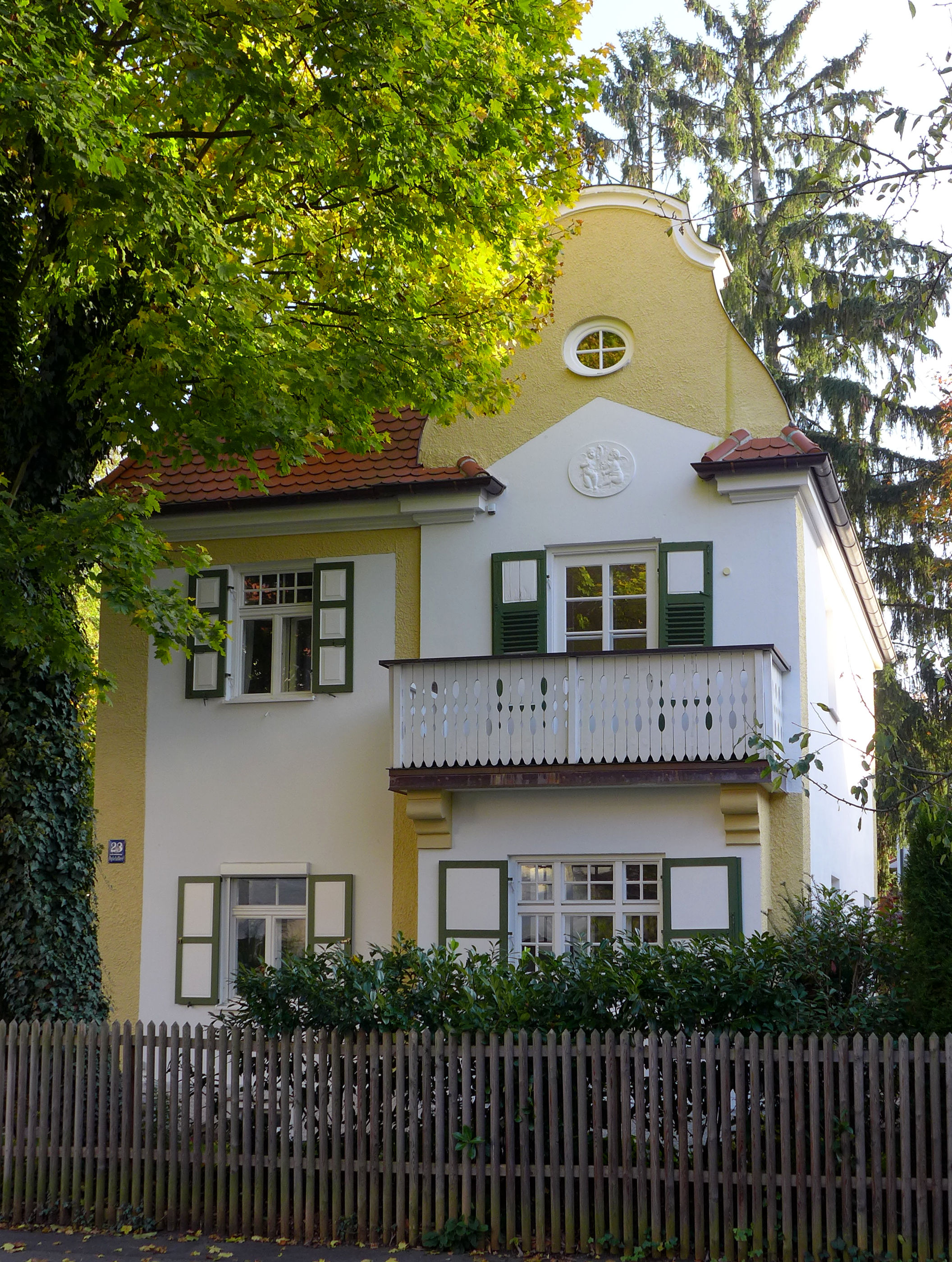
Villa Apfelallee 23

- Apfelallee 2 (villa)
- Apfelallee 3 (villa)
- Apfelallee 5 (villa)
- Apfelallee 7 (villa)
- Apfelallee 9 (villa)
- Apfelallee 13 (villa)
- Apfelallee 15 (villa)
- Apfelallee 16 (villa)
- Apfelallee 17 (villa)
- Apfelallee 21 (villa)
- Apfelallee 23 (villa)
- Apfelallee 26a (villa)
