= Lützowstraße =

Street in Munich, Germany

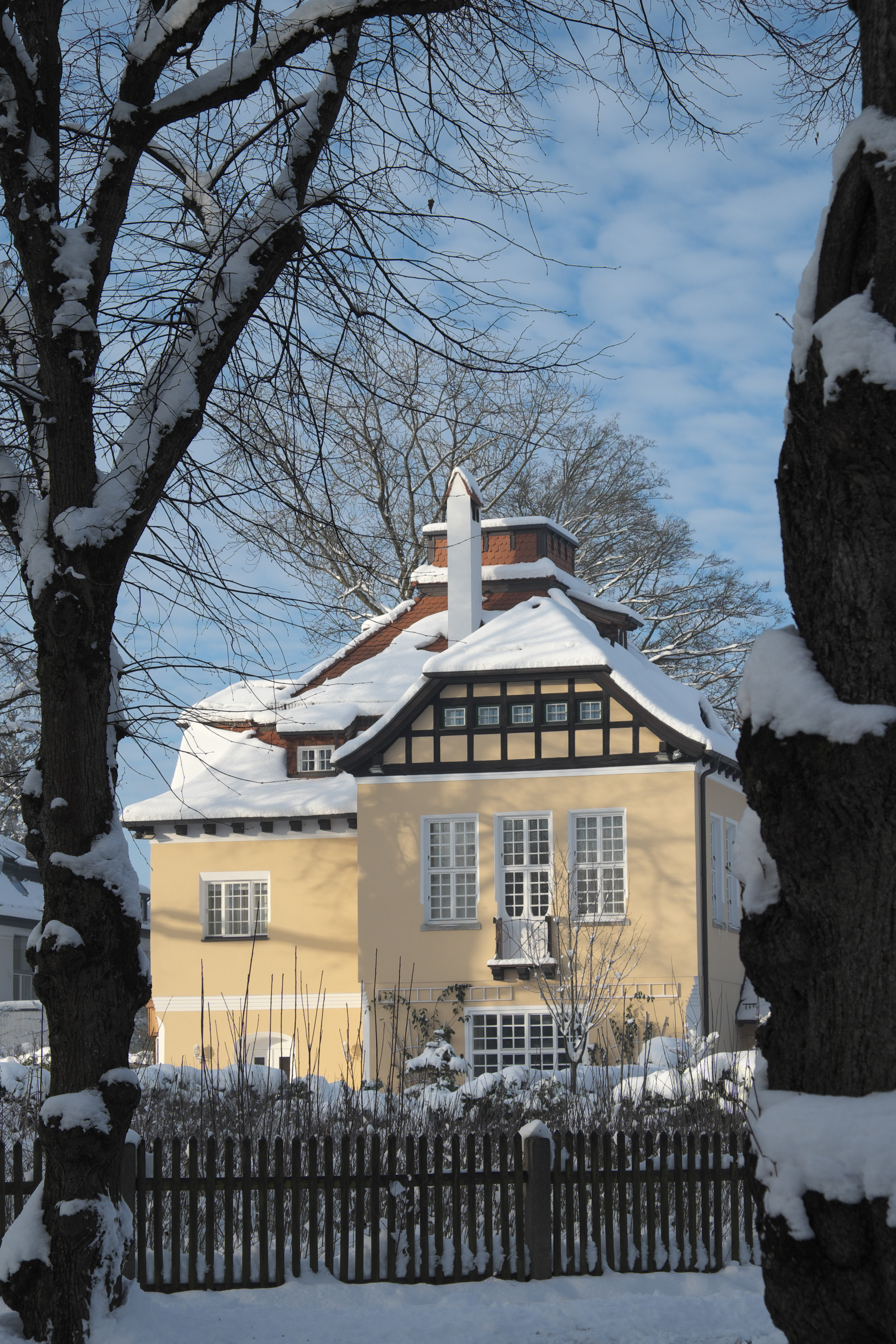
Riemerschmid-Villa

Lützowstraße is a street in the Munich districts of Pasing and Obermenzing, which was built from 1897 onwards. The street was named after the Prussian Generalmajor Ludwig Adolf Wilhelm von Lützow.

== History ==
The Lützowstraße was first called II. Apfelallee and then Marienstrasse. It is a west–east-oriented street of the Villenkolonie Pasing II. It starts at Pippinger Straße, crosses the Alte Allee and ends at Marschnerstraße.

The development began in 1897 with simple villas. On the northern side of the Lützowstraße, between Pippinger Strasse and Alte Allee, there is still a gaping construction display with row and double houses dating from around 1910. The vacant lots, along the remaining road area have been closed in recent years. The outstanding building of Lützowstraße is the Riemerschmid-Villa (Lützowstraße 11).

== Historical buildings ==
- Lützowstraße 1 (Munich) (Residential building)
- Lützowstraße 6–10 (Munich) (Residential building group)
- Lützowstraße 11 (Munich) (Villa)
- Lützowstraße 16/18 (Munich) (Double Villa)
- Lützowstraße 28 (Munich) (Residential building)
- Lützowstraße 46 (Munich) (Villa)
