= Villenkolonie Pasing I =

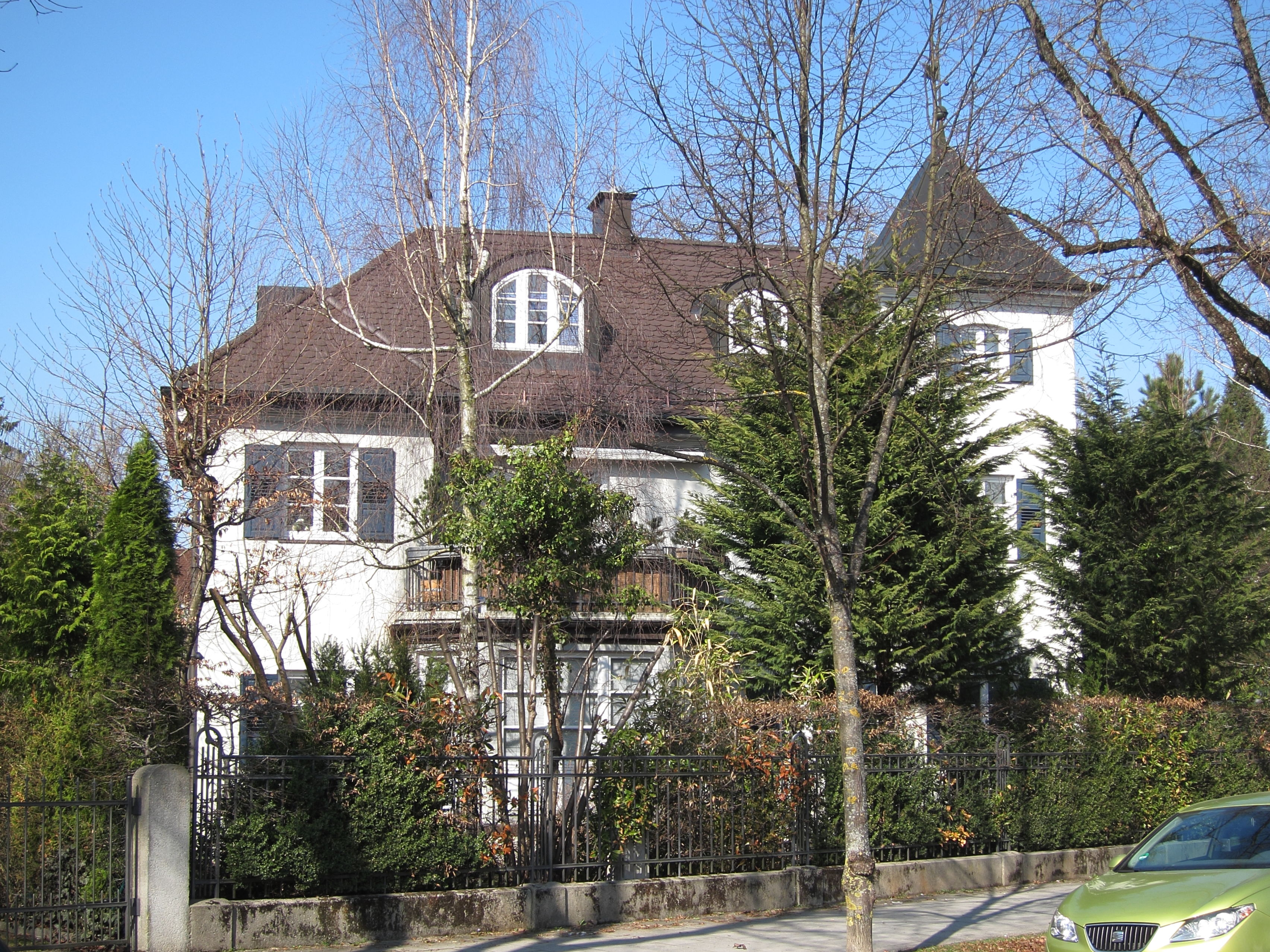
House August-Exter-Straße 19

The Villenkolonie Pasing I is a single-family house colony in Munich-Pasing.

== History ==
The Villenkolonie Pasing I was built on the initiative of the architect August Exter, starting in 1892, as "Villenkolonie Neu-Pasing I". Exter acquired a large piece of arable land and connected the area, at his own expense, with its own canal system and water through a water tower on Orthstraße. This settlement with numerous historically protected buildings followed the idea of the Garden city movement. The project was very successful, and nearly all of the 120 sites were sold in 1895. The building styles were based on historical models and, on the other hand, local building traditions. The Villenkolonie is bounded to the south by the railways, in the west and north by the Nymphenburger Kanal and in the east by the Offenbachstraße. In 1897, west of the Pippinger Straße, the Villenkolonie Pasing II was established. In 1973 the ensemble of Villenkolonie Pasing I was protected as historical monument.

== Literature ==
- Pasinger Fabrik GmbH (ed.): Architect August Exter - Villen Colonien Pasing; Publikation zur Ausstellung 2. - 31. Okt. 1993; Buchendorfer Verlag, Munich 1993; ISBN 3-927984-19-1
- Renate Mayer-Zaky, Reinhard Bauer: Pasing. Stadt in der Stadt. Das Stadtteilbuch. 1996, ISBN 3-923395-02-7.
- Michael Petzet, Heinrich Habel, Johannes Hallinger, Timm Weski: Denkmäler in Bayern: Landeshauptstadt München Mitte. 3 volumes. Edition Lipp, 2009, ISBN 978-3-87490-586-2.
