= Villenkolonie Pasing II =

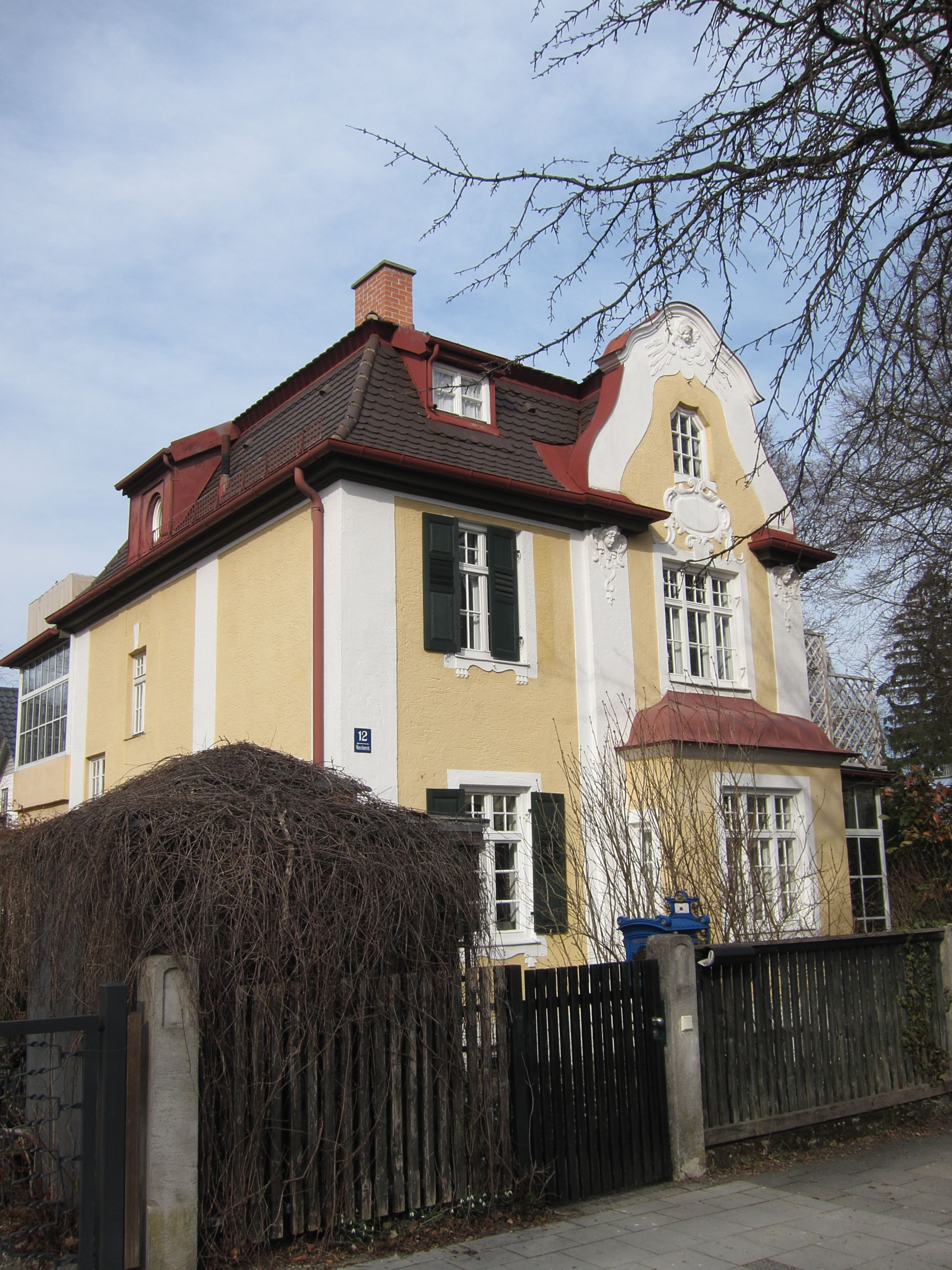
House Marschnerstraße 12

The Villenkolonie Pasing II is a single-family home colony in Munich-Pasing. It was built according to the model of a garden town.

== History ==
The idea of the Villenkolonie Pasing II, west of the Würm river, also came from August Exter, but he failed to execute the plan. In 1897, Exter gave up his construction business and gradually withdrew himself from architectural activity. Contrary to the widely assumed rumors that Exter also built the Villenkolonie Pasing II, the undeveloped property became the property of the Terraingesellschaft Neu-Westend AG in 1899. The highest bidder was Lazard Speyer-Ellissen, a Frankfurt-based bank led by Georg Speyer. The development of the site was carried out by the Neu-Westend AG. Extern's debts to the city of Pasing were taken over by the royal bank branch. Until 1900, 90 houses were built, but then the construction progress stagnated. In 1929, there were 106 houses under construction for several hundreds of first inquiries.

The settlement with numerous historically listed buildings extends today from the railway line in the south and west to the river Würm in the east and the Bergsonstraße to the north.

== Streets ==
In brackets original description:

- Alte Allee (Langwieder Straße)
- Apfelallee (III. Apfelallee)
- Barystraße (Kleiststraße)
- Hofmillerstraße (IV. Apfelallee)
- Lützowstraße (II. Apfelallee)
- Mark-Twain-Straße (Kirchenstraße)
- Marschnerstraße (Riemerschmidstraße)
- Pippinger Straße (the Pippinger Straße already existed before the creation of the Villenkolonie Pasing II, the street was partly built up as part of the Villenkolonie)
- Rembrandtstraße (I. Apfelallee)
- Rubensstraße (V. Apfelallee)
