= Marschnerstraße =

Street in Munich, Germany

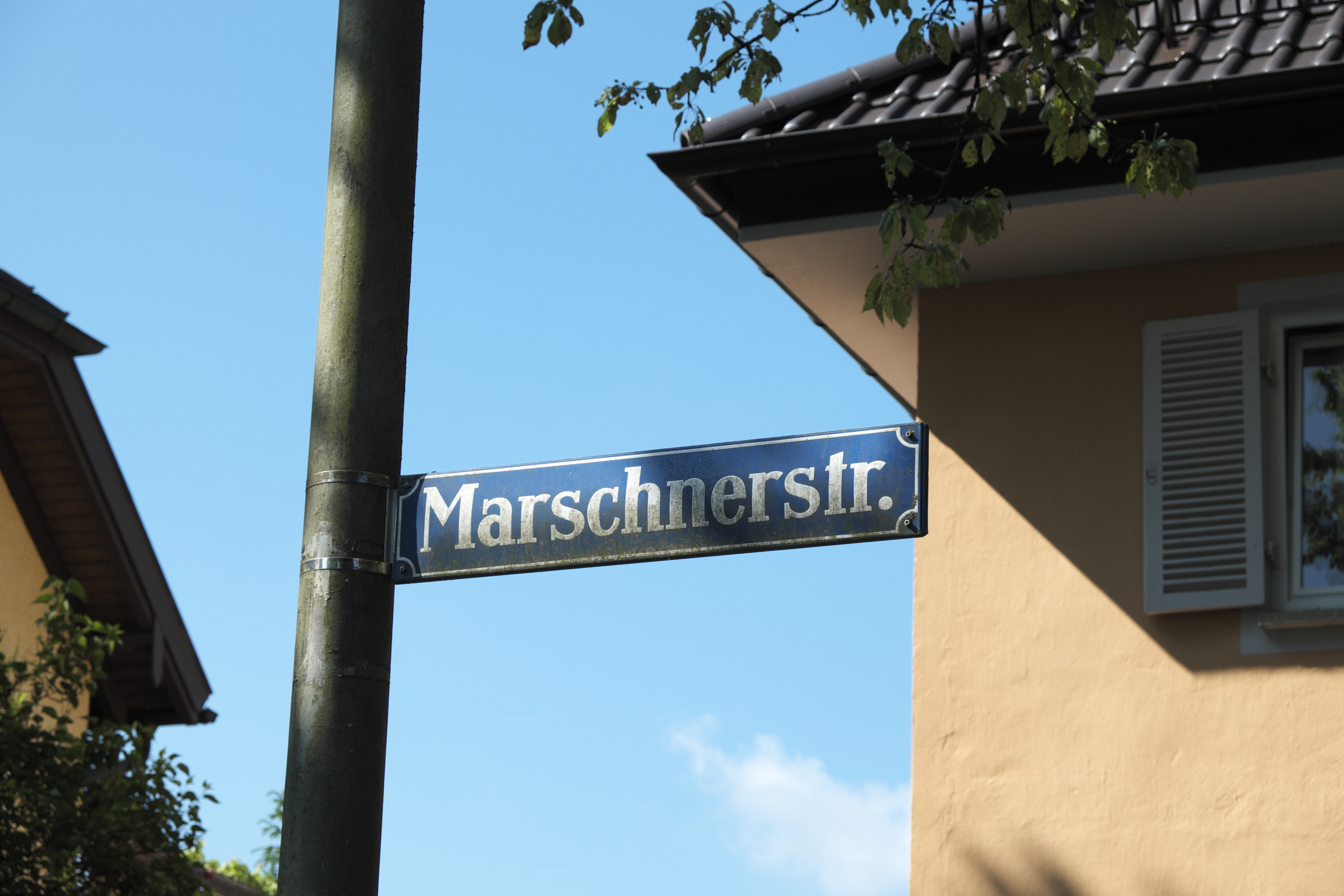

The Marschnerstraße, named after the composer Heinrich Marschner (1795-1861), is a street founded in 1897, in the Munich district of Pasing and Obermenzing.

== History ==
Marschnerstraße, originally named Riemerschmidstraße, is alongside the Alte Allee, the second main connecting street in the Villenkolonie Pasing II, which was created to reflect the model of a garden city. The Marschnerstraße begins at the Alte Allee, where the Himmelfahrtskirche stands as a monumental construction, and leads to the Peter-Kreuder-Straße.

The Allee runs parallel to the Munich-Augsburg train route. In the first decade a sporadic construction of villas occurred there.

== Historical buildings on Marschnerstraße ==
Pasing:
- Marschnerstraße 2: Himmelfahrtskirche
- Marschnerstraße 3/3a (Semidetached house)
- Marschnerstraße 12 (Villa)
- Marschnerstraße 16 (Villa)
- Marschnerstraße 21 (Villa)
- Marschnerstraße 22 (Villa)
- Marschnerstraße 23 (residential building)
- Marschnerstraße 24 (Villa)
- Marschnerstraße 26 (Villa)
- Marschnerstraße 27a (Villa)
- Marschnerstraße 29 (Dwelling house), Semidetached house with no. 31
- Marschnerstraße 30 (Villa)
- Marschnerstraße 31 (Villa), Semidetached house with no. 29
- Marschnerstraße 33 (Villa)
- Marschnerstraße 35–41g (Row house group)
Obermenzing:
- Marschnerstraße 42 (Villa)
- Marschnerstraße 43 (Villa)
- Marschnerstraße 44 (Villa)
- Marschnerstraße 55 (Villa)
- Marschnerstraße 59 (Villa)

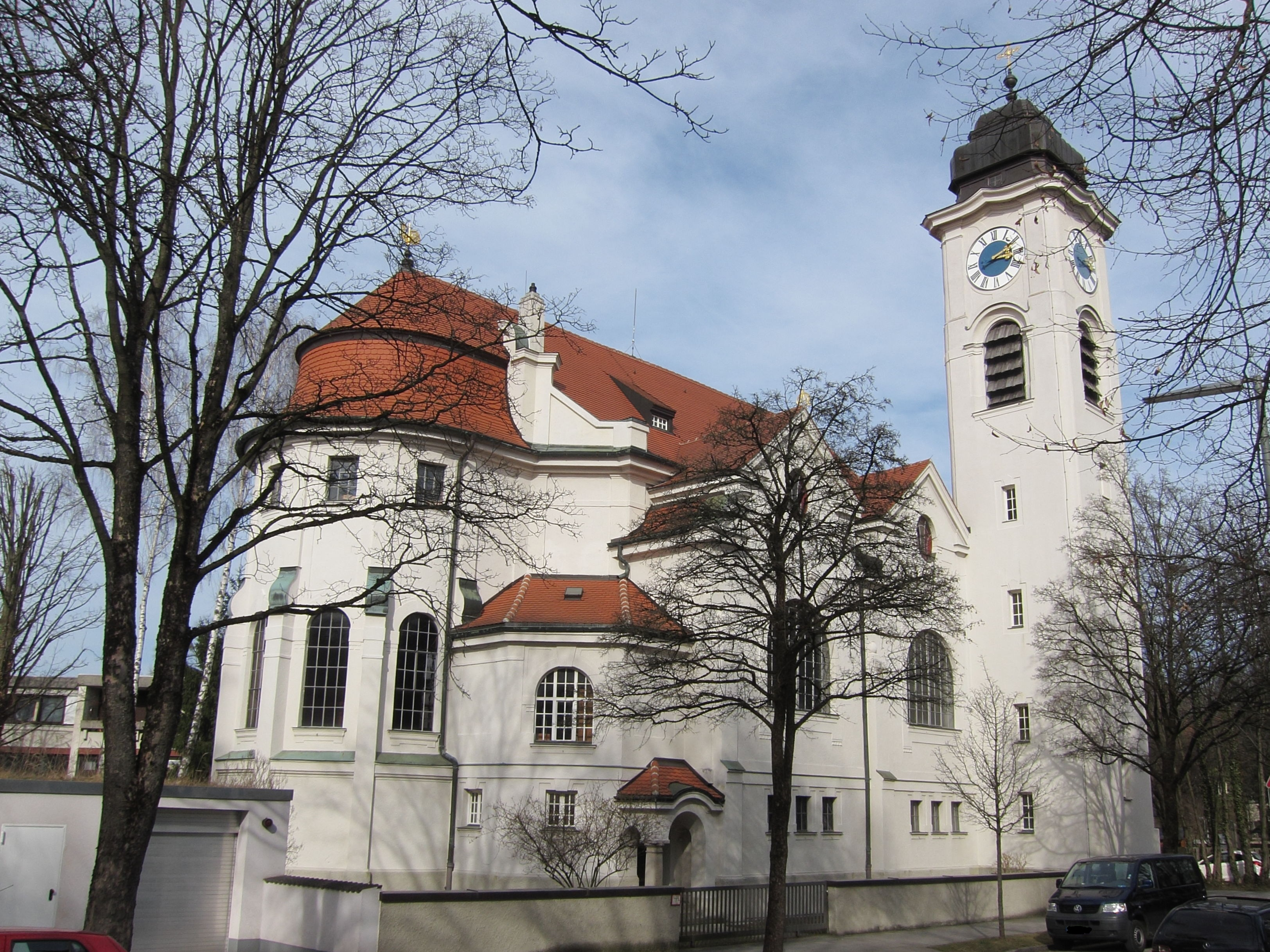
Himmelfahrtskirche

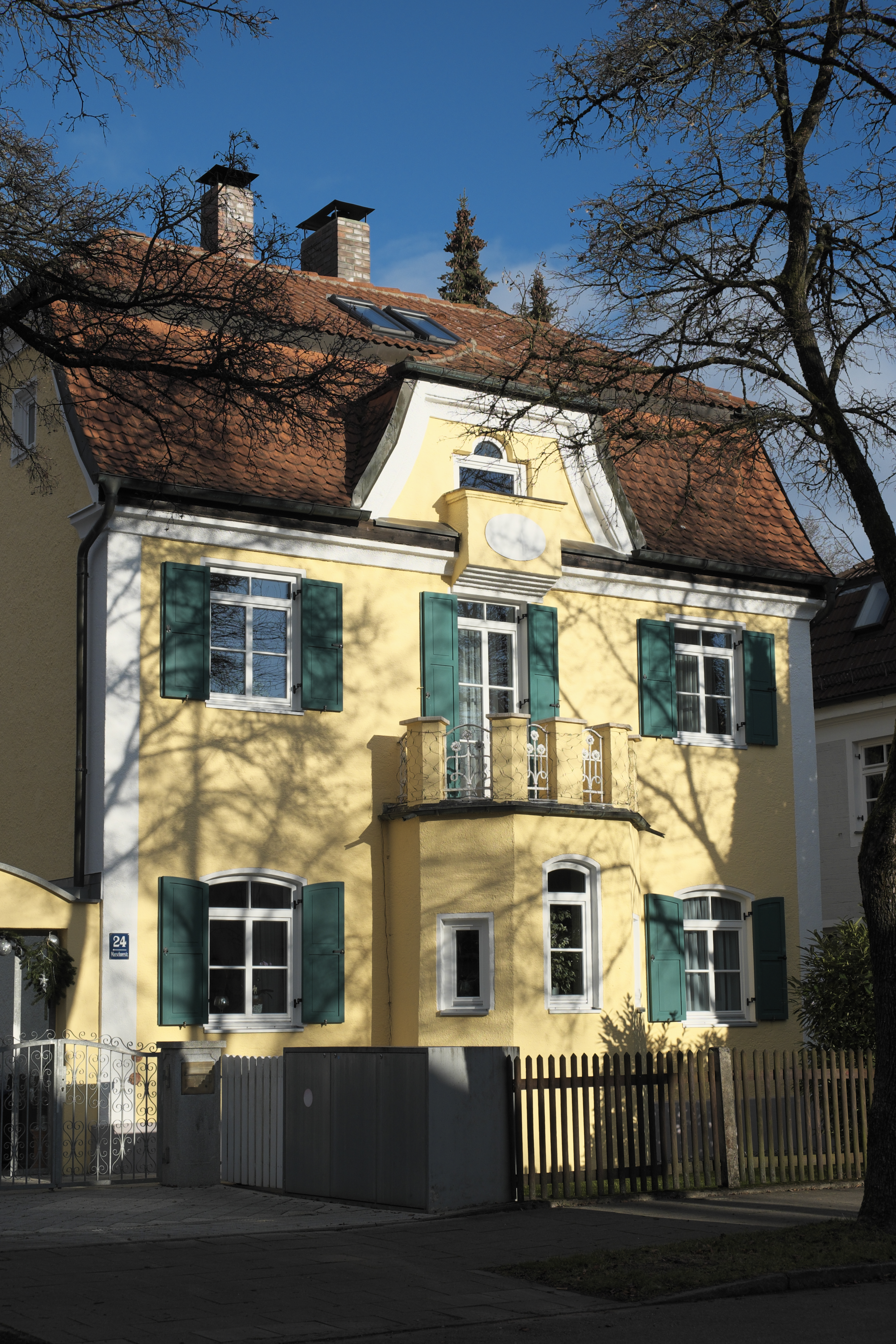
Villa Marschnerstraße 24

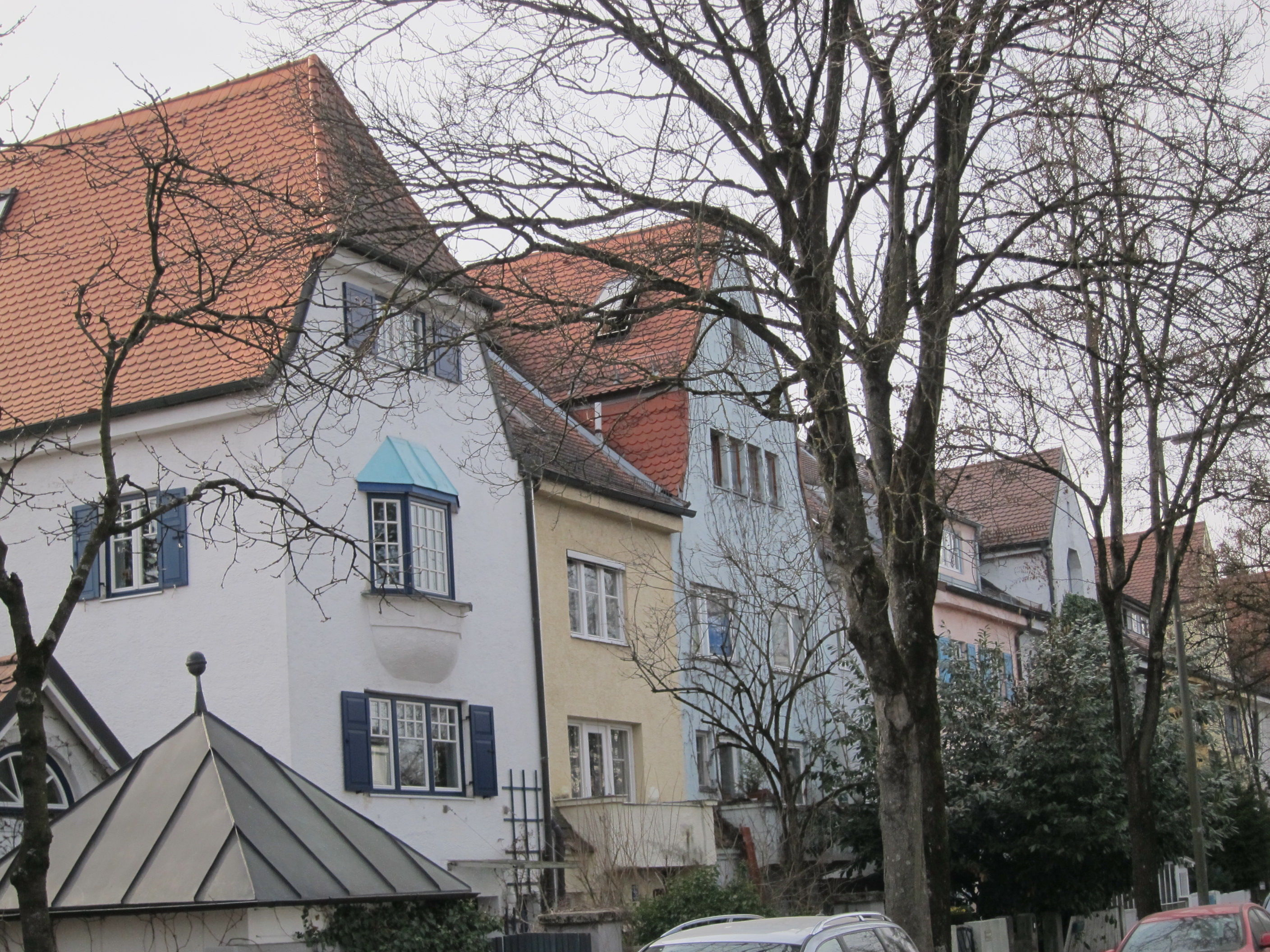
Row house group Marschnerstraße 35–41b

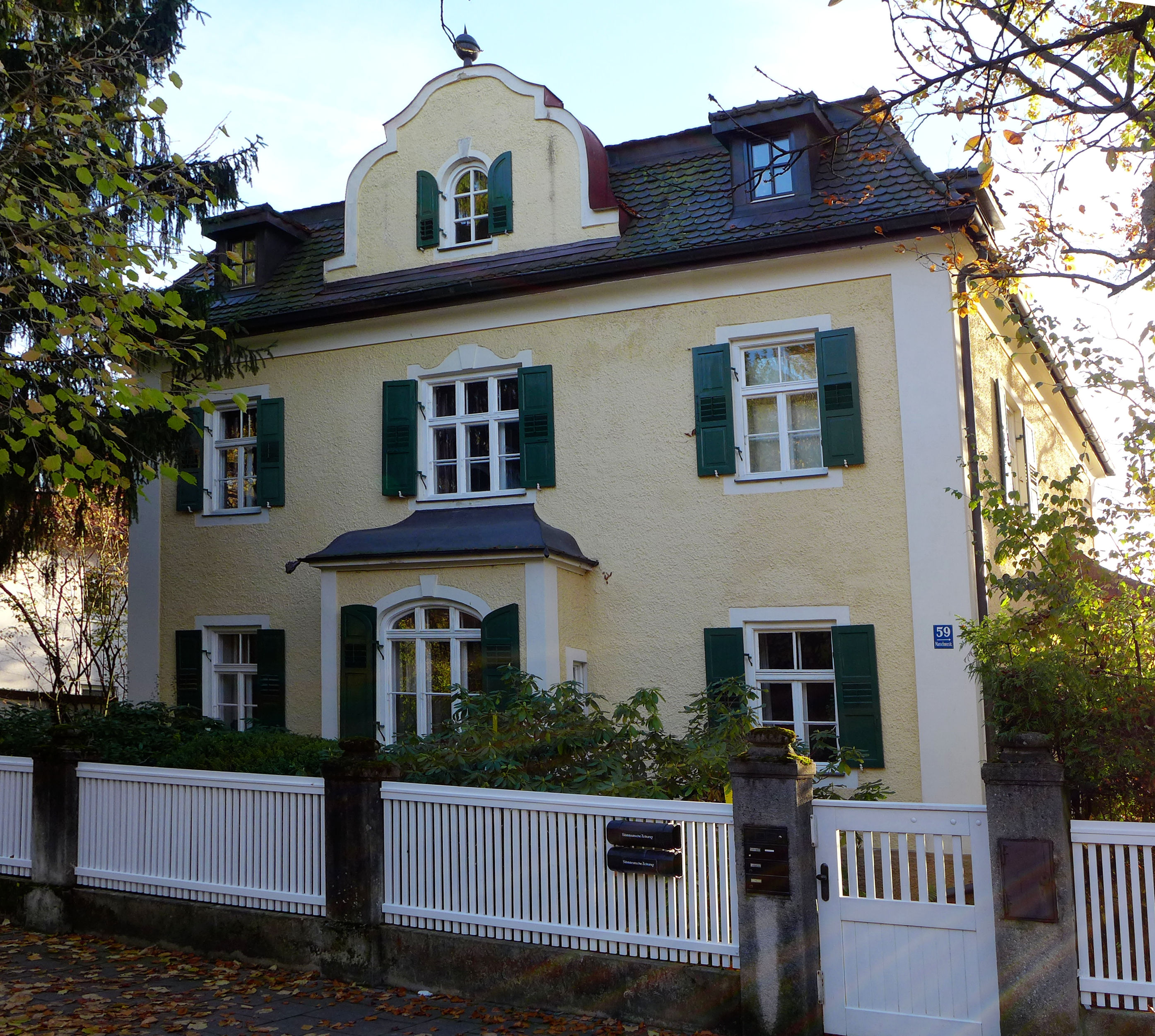
Villa Marschnerstraße 59

== Literature ==
- Dennis A. Chevalley, Timm Weski: Landeshauptstadt München – Südwest (= Bavarian State Office for Monument Protection [ed.]: Denkmäler in Bayern. Vol. I.2/2). Karl M. Lipp Verlag, Munich 2004, ISBN 3-87490-584-5, p. 430–431.
