= Bavarian State Office for Monument Protection =

Bavarian government agency

- Bayerisches Landesamt für Denkmalpflege – BLfD –

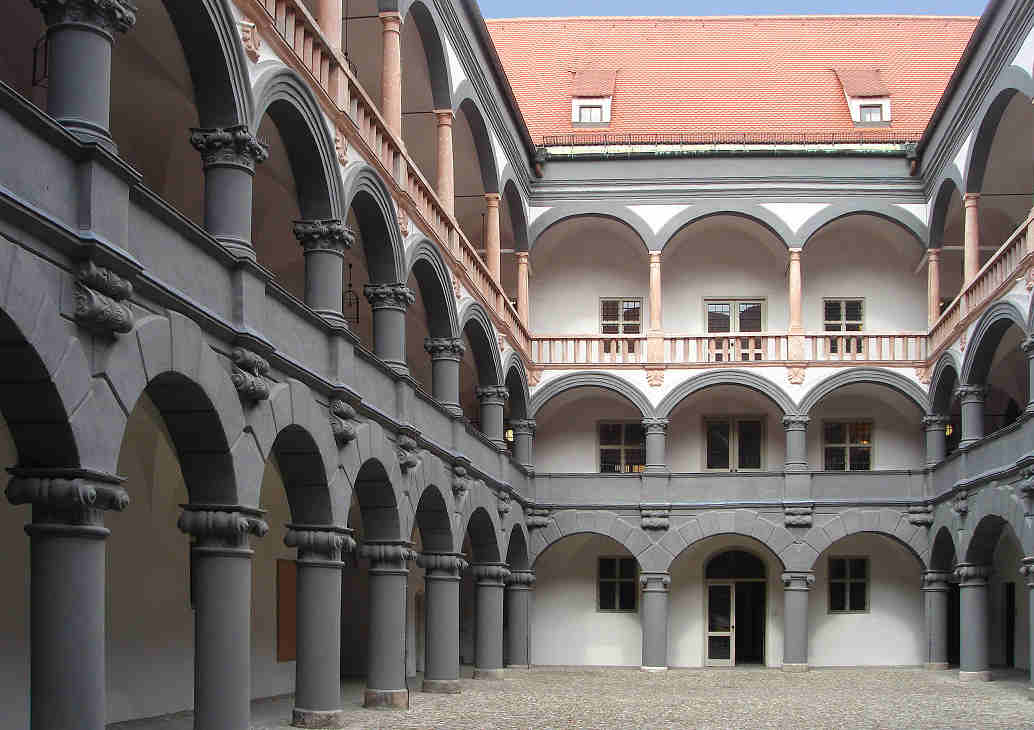
- Head office of the BLfD in Munich
- Formation: 6 September 1908 (117 years ago)
- Legal status: Landesamt (Bavaria)
- Purpose: Denkmalfachbehörde
- Headquarters: Munich
- Coordinates: 48°8′21″N 11°34′43″E
- Members: >300
- Generalkonservator: Mathias Pfeil (since 1 March 2014)
- Parent organisation: Bavarian State Ministry for Education and Culture, Science and Art
- Website: www.blfd.bayern.de

The Bavarian State Office for Monument Protection (German: Bayerisches Landesamt für Denkmalpflege, BLfD) is the Bavarian central state authority for the protection of historical monuments. It is responsible for the conservation of both historic buildings as well as heritage sites and their archaeology.

== Bavarian Museum Service ==
One department of the State Office is the Bavarian Museum Service (German: Landesstelle für die nichtstaatlichen Museen in Bayern). It advises and supports approximately 1,200 small and medium-sized museums, which are not run by the State of Bavaria.
