= Pippinger Straße =

Street in Munich, Germany

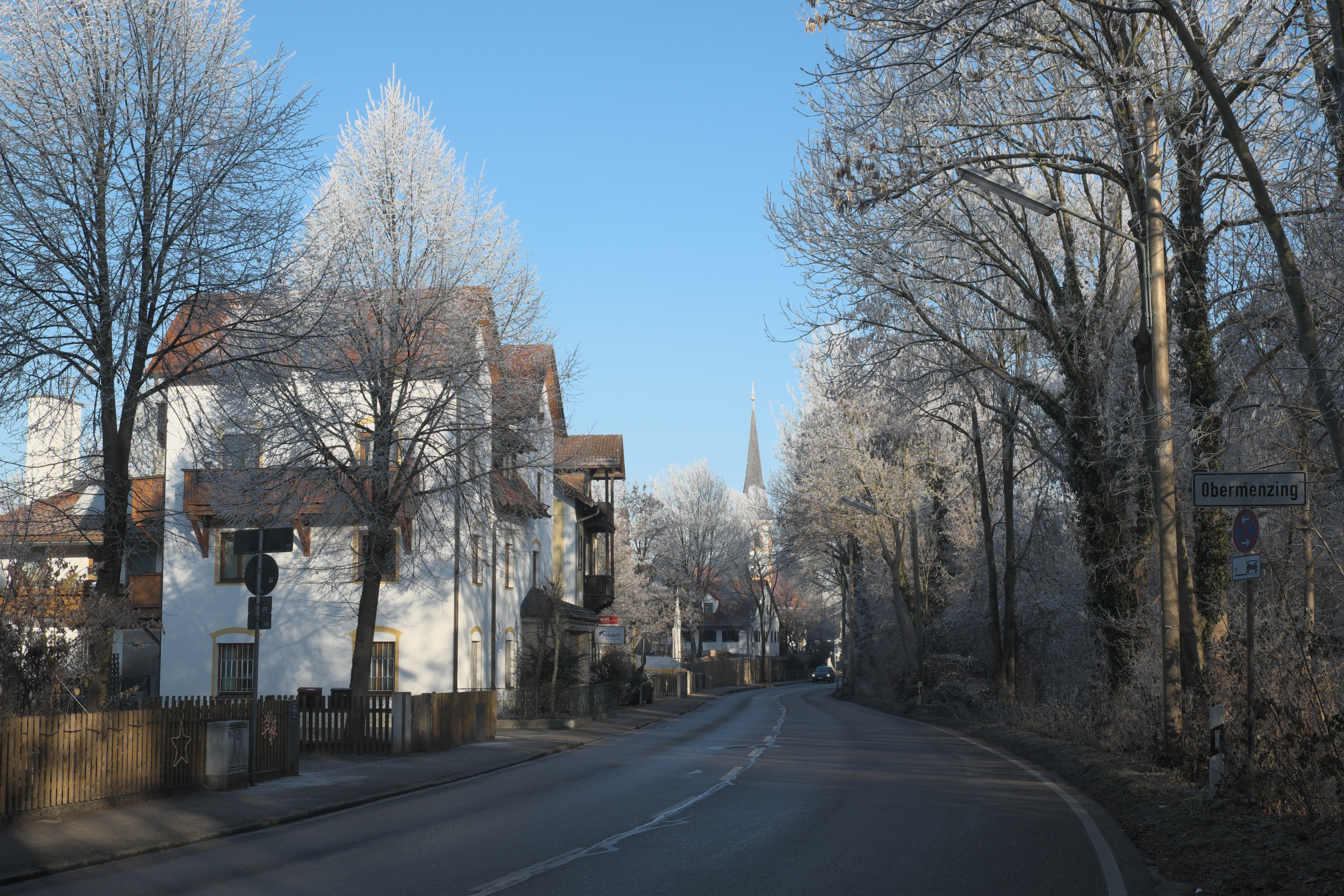

The Pippinger Straße is a street in the Munich districts of Pasing and Obermenzing, which for centuries runs as the Würmtalstraße on the left bank of the Würm river. The roads full-length runs through rural area, partially with fields on the western side, and undeveloped areas, although the road serves as a main connection to the Bundesautobahn 8.

== History ==
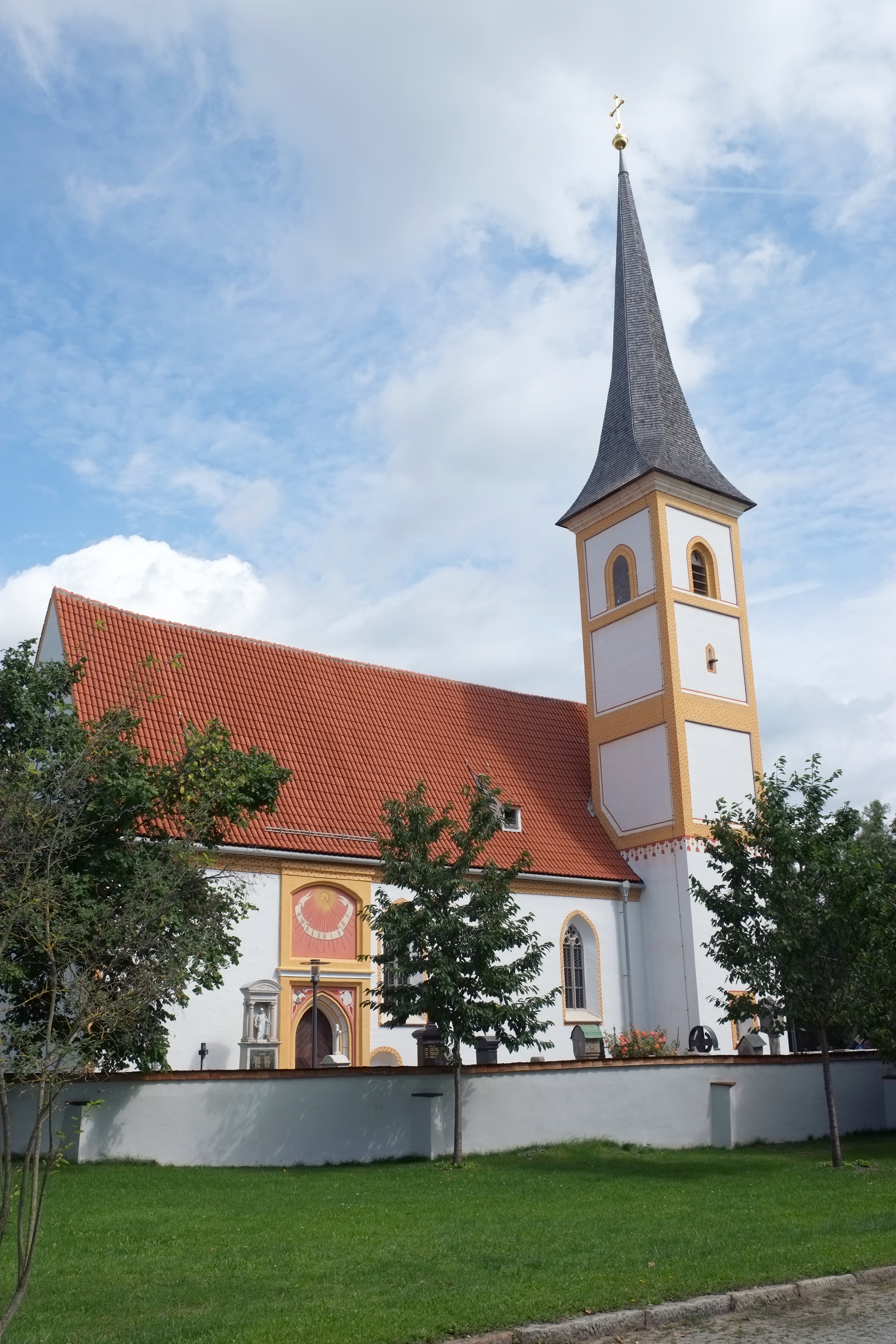
Church of St. Wolfgang

The Pippinger Straße starts at the railway underpass west of the Munich Pasing station and touches the Villenkolonie Pasing II. It crosses the former hamlet of Pipping. At the height of the former farms of Pipping is also the village church of St. Wolfgang, which was built between 1478 and 1480. Then the Pippinger Straße passes the Blutenburg Castle and, after crossing the Verdistraße, forms the main axis in the village core of Obermenzing. Finally, it leads into Von-Kahr-Straße.

== Historical buildings on Pippinger Straße ==
- Church of St. Wolfgang
- Alte Allee 2 / corner of Pippinger Straße (residential building)
- Pippinger Straße 35 (residential house)
- Pippinger Straße 37 (former farmhouse)
- Pippinger Straße 47g (former farmhouse)
- Pippinger Straße 49 (former farmhouse)
- Pippinger Straße 51 (former farmhouse)
- Pippinger Straße 97 (residential house)
- Pippinger Straße 115 (Villa)
- Pippinger Straße 121 (former farmhouse)
- Pippinger Straße 123 (Villa)
