= Alte Allee (Munich) =

Street in Munich, Germany

Alte Allee is an avenue in the Munich districts of Pasing and Obermenzing, which was built around 1897.

== History ==
The avenue, originally called Langwieder Straße, is the main connecting road to the Villenkolonie Pasing II, which was built according to the model of a garden town. The Alte Allee begins at Pippinger Straße, where it forms a triangular square, and leads up to Bergsonstraße. After the junction with Lützowstraße, the district of Obermenzing begins.

The avenue runs parallel to the Munich–Augsburg railway. In the first decades, there was a sporadic development of Villas, until the junction with Gustav-Meyrink-Straße.

Along the Marschnerstraße, the Alte Allee forms the second longitudinal section of the colony's ladder-shaped road network. The continuation of the road to the north occurred in the 1930s, predominantly after the World War II. The avenue lined with lime trees has a historic building which is enclosed by residential buildings and housing estates, which is part of the ensemble Villenkolonie Pasing II.

== Historical buildings ==
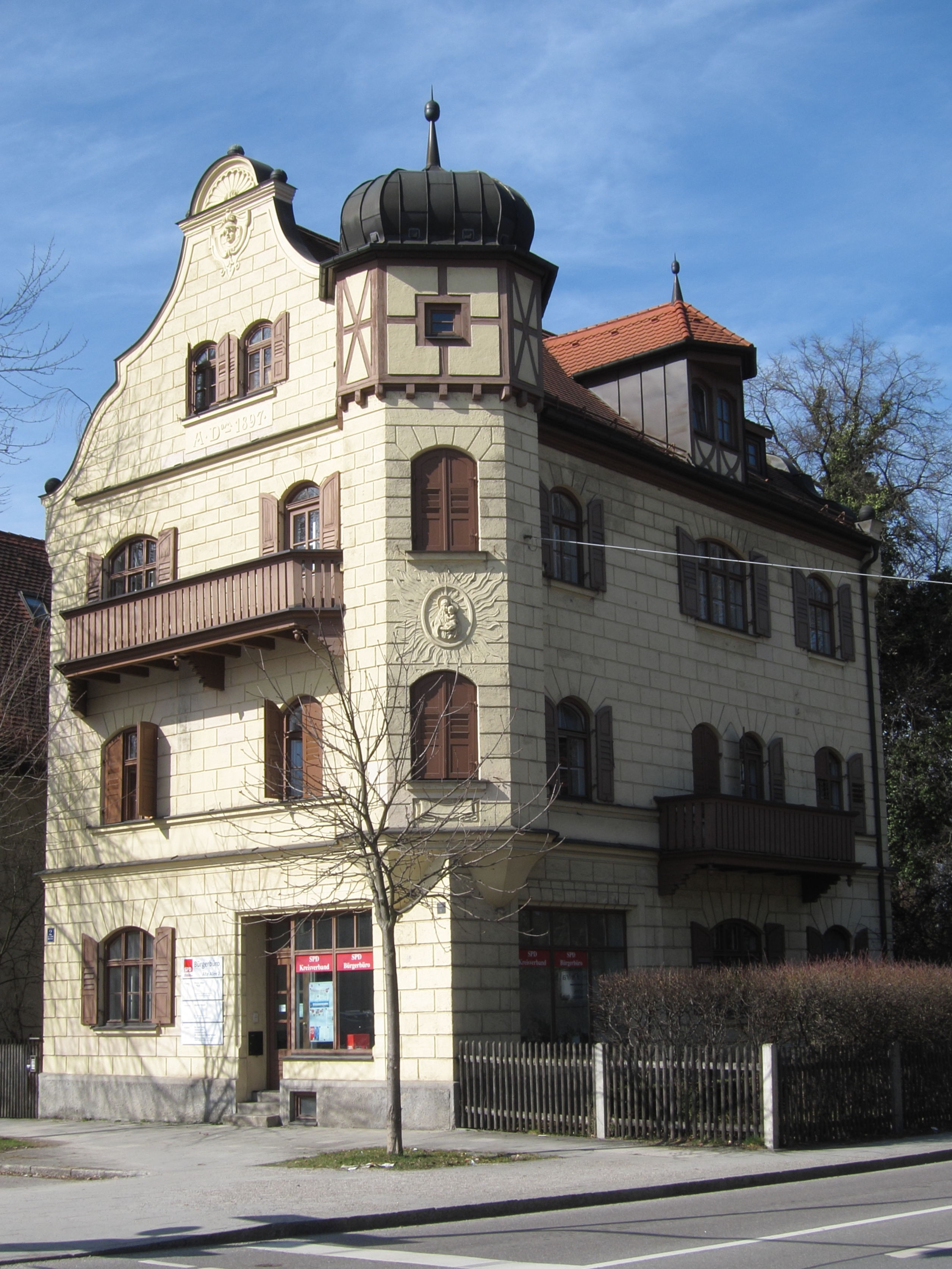
Alte Allee 2

=== Pasing ===
- Alte Allee 2 (House)
- Alte Allee 4 (House)
- Alte Allee 7 (Villa)
- Alte Allee 13 (House)

=== Obermenzing ===
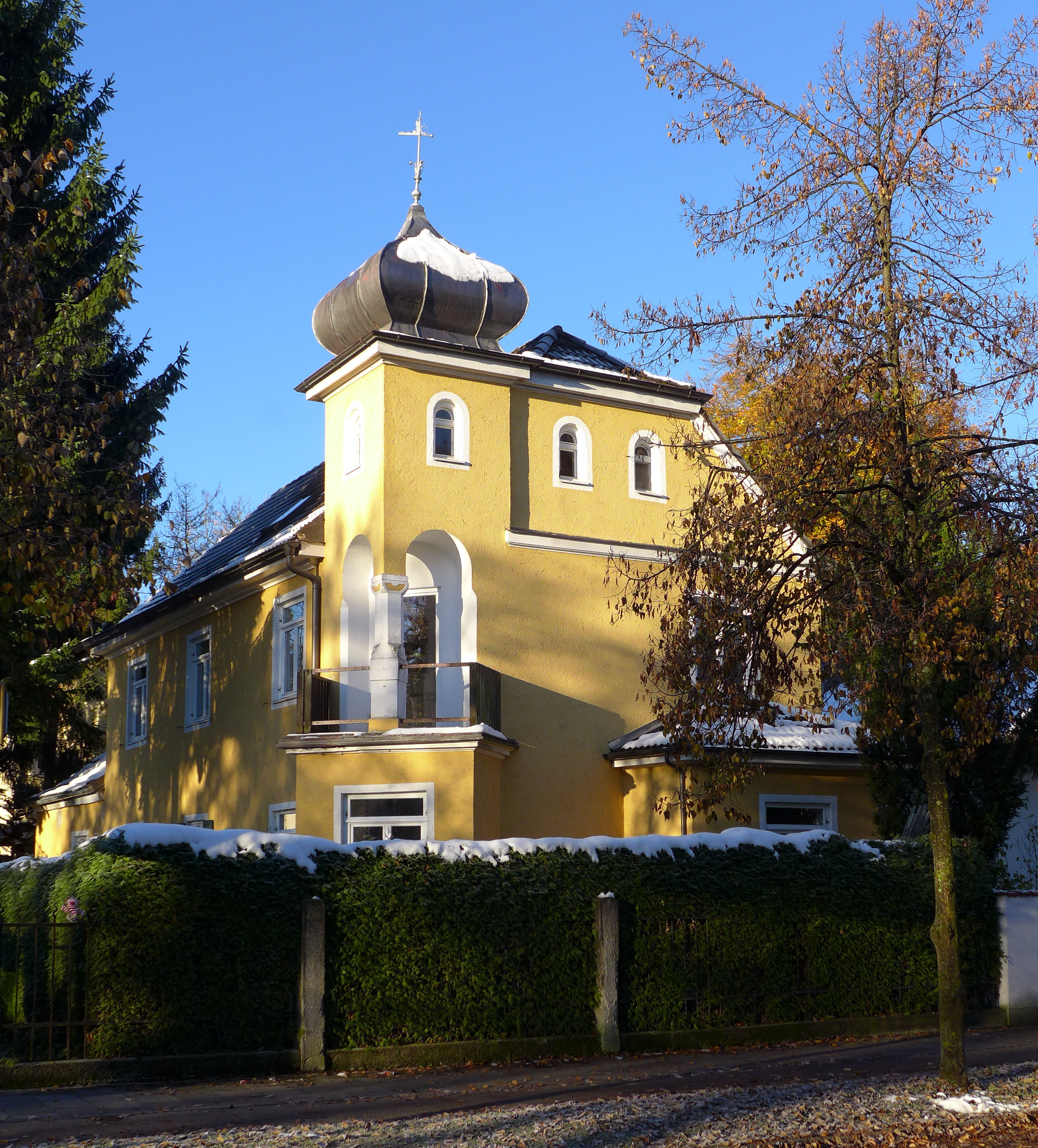
Alte Allee 17

- Alte Allee 17 (Villa)
- Alte Allee 19 (House)
- Alte Allee 21 (Restaurant "Jagdschloss")
- Alte Allee 29 (Villa)
- Alte Allee 46 (Villa)

== Literature ==
- Dennis A. Chevalley, Timm Weski: Landeshauptstadt München – Südwest (= Bavarian State Office for Monument Protection [ed.]: Denkmäler in Bayern. Vol. I.2/2). Karl M. Lipp Verlag, Munich 2004, ISBN 3-87490-584-5, p. 46.
