= Pasing-Obermenzing =

Borough of Munich, Germany

Coordinates: 48.153°N 11.466°E

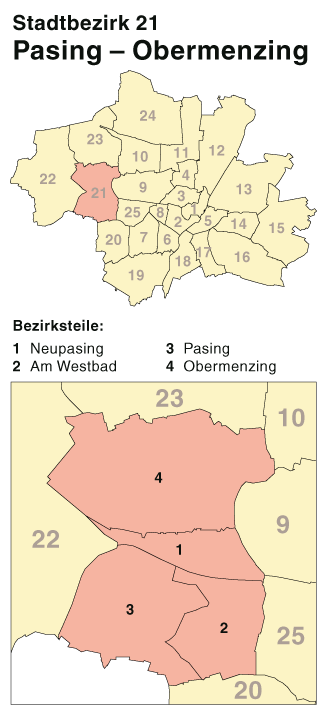
District map

Pasing-Obermenzing (German pronunciation: [ˈpaːzɪŋ ʔoːbɐˈmɛntsɪŋ]) is the 21st borough of Munich. It is located west of the city center and has a population of about 81,000. It consists of the two districts Pasing and Obermenzing (lit. 'Upper Menzing'), which were both incorporated into Munich in 1938.

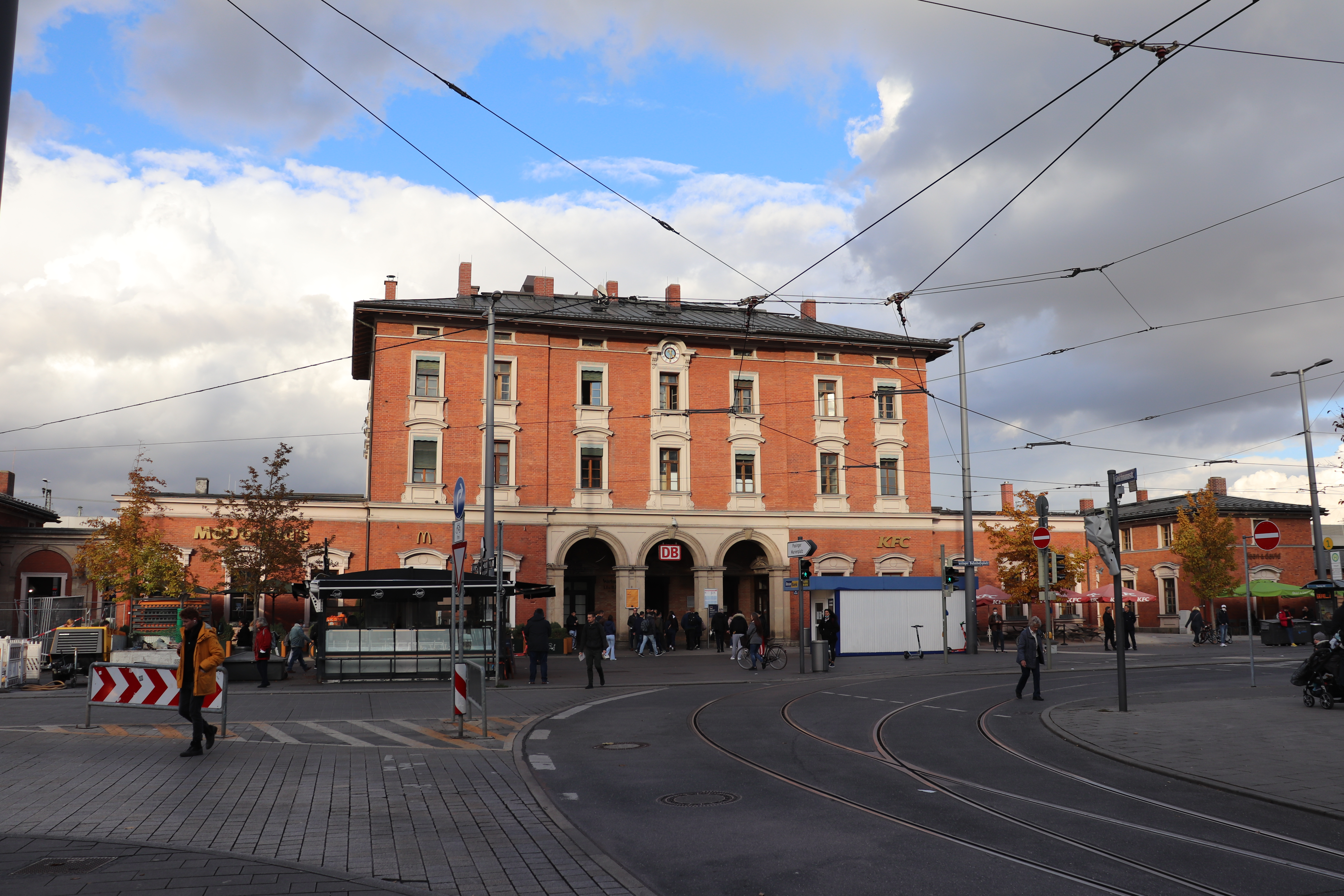
Pasing train station.

== See also ==
- Rubensstraße (Munich)
