= Haman Alimardani =

Iranian-German fashion designer (born 1977)

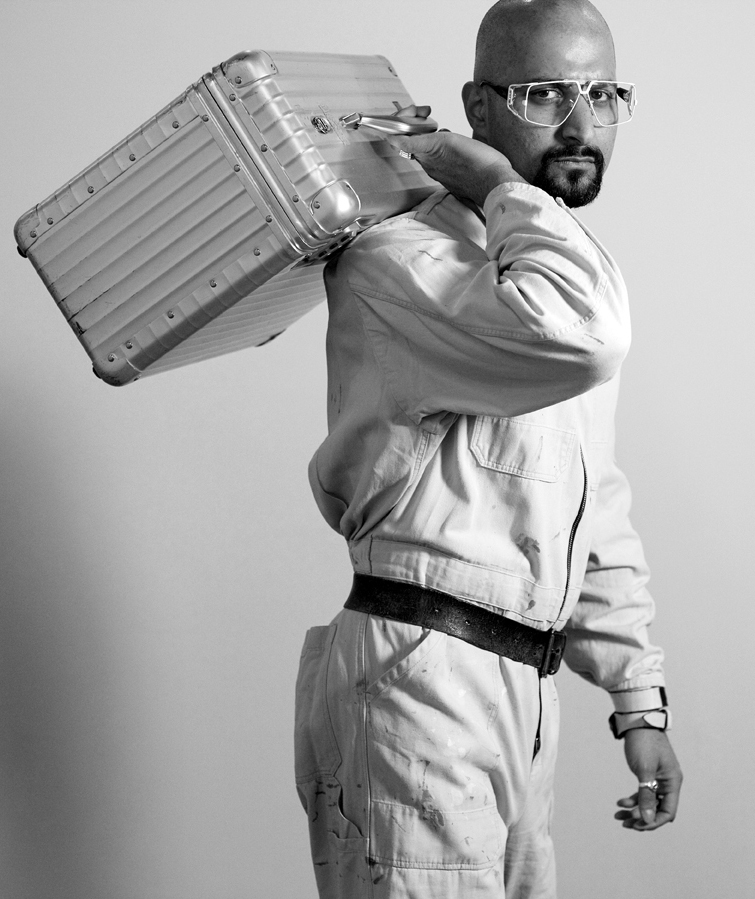
Haman Alimardani, 2010

Haman Alimardani (Persian: هامان علیمردانی; born 28 November 1977) is an Iranian-born German fashion designer, graphic designer, and disc jockey. Hamansutra is his fashion label. He lives and works in New York City and Munich.

== Life ==
Haman Alimardani was born in 1977 in Tehran, Pahlavi Iran. He comes from the third generation of a Persian family of chefs, restaurateurs and gourmets. He and his four siblings grew up in Tehran, New York City, and Munich. Alimardani speaks fluent German, English and Persian.

Music and art played major roles in his youth; he rapidly attained status in both fields in the Munich scene, as a respected graffiti writer and club DJ for soul, house and rap music. In 1993 the artists' group of which Alimardani was a member received artistic funding from the City of Munich.

== Education, study and training ==
After secondary school, Alimardani initially studied graphic design at Blocherer Schule, Munich (graduating in 1998), and took up fashion design studies at Central Saint Martins College of Art and Design in London in 2004. During his studies Alimardani completed internships as assistant to fashion designer Kostas Murkudis, designer at the Munich armed forces tailoring department and costume designer at the Bavarian State Opera.

== Career as fashion designer ==
In 1996, Alimardani founded his own fashion label "hamansutra". Even before completing his fashion design studies, he designed "Lingerie For The Year 2000" for German underwear brand Mey. Two years later, working as hamansutra, he completed the costumes for a major project at London Film School. In 2003 and 2004, hamansutra was commissioned by Jung von Matt to create a full body suit known as "Blu Costume" for the Geiz ist geil (Cheap Is Cool) advertising campaign for the consumer electronics chain Saturn. In 2004, hamansutra designed the outfits for the video production of "Another World" by UK singer Sonique. The video received the 2005 iF Communication Design Award. Also in 2005, hamansutra designed menswear prototypes for Porsche Design and contributed a T-shirt design to the T-1 Worldcup project in Japan. This event included a design competition for which international artists created works representing their countries. hamansutra designed a T-shirt collection for the Microsoft Xbox 360 at Christmas 2005. In 2006, hamansutra developed a gold suit for the video "I Can't Stop My Feet" by Munich musician and singer AMOS, also known as "Imperator of Pop". From 2005 to 2008, Haman Alimardani taught at the Munich colleges Blocherer Schule and Akademie für Mode & Design (AMD), and lectured on design at Miami Ad School in Hamburg and the Munich University of Applied Sciences. He relocated to New York in 2008. In 2010, hamansutra joined forces with StudioSeidel on the project 2010 Amateur World Cup. The project, set to music by Gomma Records, presented a fashion collection oriented to the World Cup teams and matches and prominently featuring elements of the aesthetics of pornography, as a satire on the predominant interests of our consumption-driven world. hamansutra is worked on a line of accessories scheduled for launch at the end of 2011.

== Career as graphic designer ==
Haman Alimardani's work with Jung von Matt in Hamburg gave rise to graphic projects for Benson & Hedges, Audi and Deutsche Bahn in 1998 and 1999. In 2002 Alimardani worked with Nike on the Scorpion K.O. project, realized in partnership with the US media agency Wieden+Kennedy and the Berlin-based creative agency Less Rain. In the same year he was booked by the French fashion house KENZO as a character designer for the "KENZO KIDS" collection.

== Organizational culture ==
Alimardani's affinity with music is constantly reflected in his design. The hamansutra brand presents clothing as art objects, focusing on a holistic view of external changes which in turn necessitate the alignment of designs in keeping. The slogan "A thousand moves in the game of fashion" is intended to express this conceptual approach.

== Exhibitions ==
- 2010: hamansutra's CAZAL Sunglasses Project "Homage to Cari Zalloni". Portraits and illustrations at Pablo's Birthday gallery. The exhibition, with a personal lookbook foreword by CAZAL designer Cari Zalloni, is a fashion celebration for and about fans of CAZAL sun eyewear (New York)
- 2010: Exhibitor at the 5th NY Art Book Fair, MoMA PS1
- 2009: Invitation by Pecha Kucha to present a series of 20 images in New York
- 2009: "Artificial Skin Collection 2060" The exhibition, with a personal lookbook foreword by Arno Rink (New York and Munich, sturmfeder projects)
- 2008: "Graduate Portfolios of 8 Young Designers", Kuratorium (Munich)
- 2008: "Not-For-Sale Works" (Munich, crooma)
- 2005: "Fashion Card Book Exhibitions" (Bookshops in London, Shanghai, Hong Kong, Munich and New York)
- 2004: "Exhibition Of Finalists' Portfolios" (London, Central Saint Martins College)
- 1999: Exhibition of collection pieces and 3D illustrations (Munich, Blocherer Schule)
- 1996: Exhibition of illustrations (Gröbenzell near Munich, Bürgerhaus)
- 1995: Exhibition of illustrations (Munich, Pasinger Fabrik)

== Awards and publications ==
- hamansutra's innovative flats in the New York Times – Stepping to the Beat
- In 2011 an article on hamansutra will be published in (NOT A TOY, Pictoplasma), a collection of essays on radical character design in fashion and costume, edited by Vassilis Zidianakis of the Athens cultural organization ATOPOS.
- In 2007 hamansutra was included by Charlotte and Peter Fiell in their publication Contemporary Graphic Design ("100 of the World's Most Progressive Designers", Taschen Verlag).
- In 2005 hamansutra and Designliga München received the iF Communication Design Award.
