= Alimardani =

Alimardani (Persian: علیمردانی or علی‌مردانی) is a surname. Notable people with the surname include:

- Haman Alimardani (born 1977), Iranian fashion designer, graphic designer, and DJ
- Hatef Alimardani (born 1976), Iranian film director and screenwriter
- Mohsen Alimardani (born 1968), Iranian politician
