= Herzogstraße =

Street in Schwabing, Munich, Germany

Herzogstraße is a 1.8-kilometer-long street in Munich's Schwabing district. The street's name came from Duke Maximilian Emanuel in Bavaria.

== Route ==
Herzogstraße starts at Leopoldstraße, then crosses Belgradstraße and Schleißheimer Straße and ends at Winzererstraße. While in the area between Münchner Freiheit and Wilhelmstraße initially relatively small shops line the street, the Herzogstraße became predominantly a residential street over the years. In the area between Apianstraße and Fallmerayerstraße, numerous restaurants can be found on both sides of the street, which in the summer months, with their free play areas, shape the impression of the street. Further to the east, the Herzogstraße is primarily a residential street again.

== Historical buildings ==
In the area between Münchner Freiheit and Fallmerayerstraße, Herzogstraße is part of the protected construction ensemble Nordschwabing (E-1-62-000-42). Its design, by Theodor Fischer, was set back to the expansion of the city after the incorporation of Schwabing in 1890 to Munich and the city expansion competition of 1892. Overall, the Herzogstraße has 54 protected historical monuments, which were provided by the Bavarian State Office for Monument Protection, of which 36 are in Schwabing-West and 19 in Schwabing.

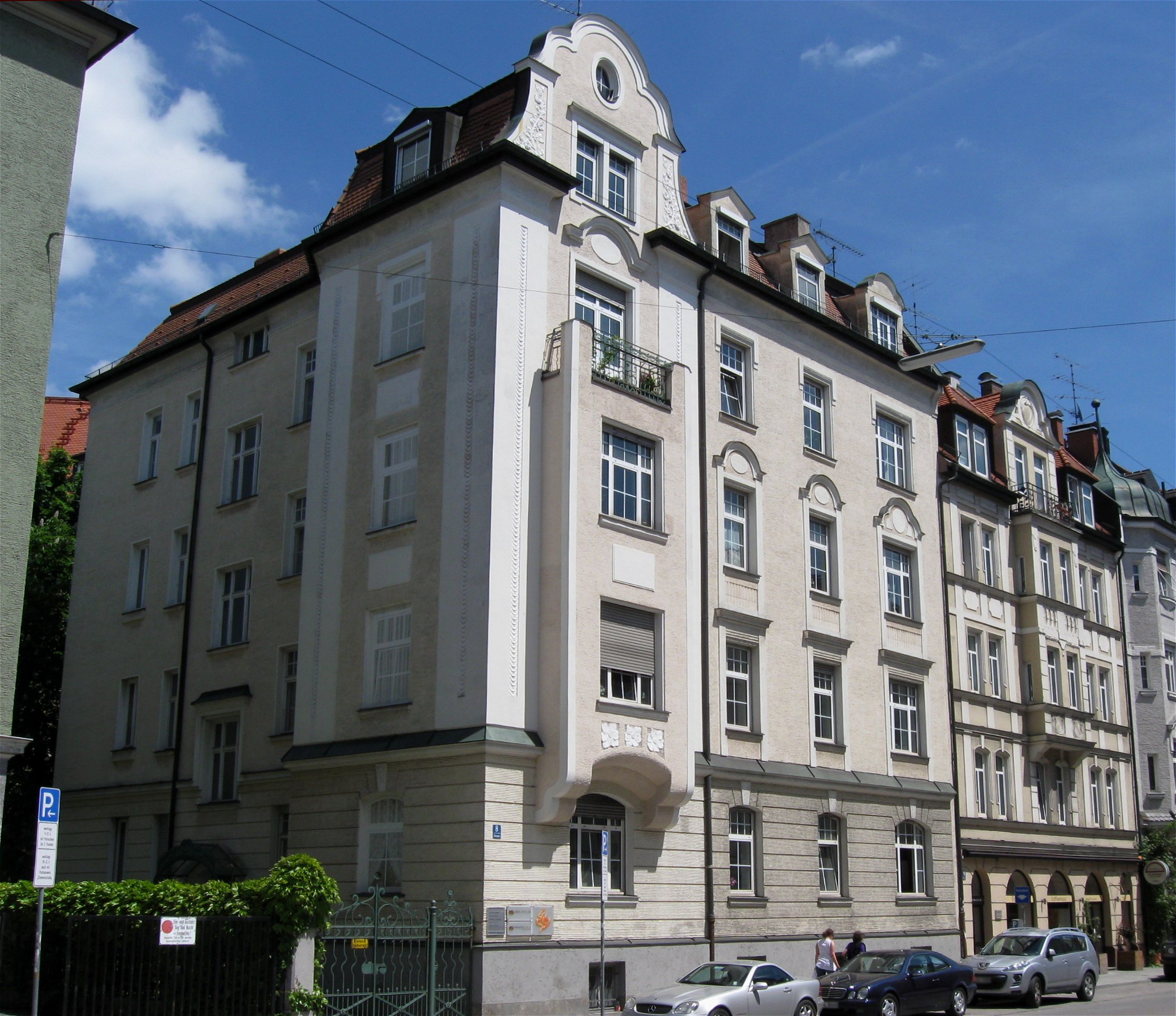
Art Nouveau building with Erkerrisalit and stucco decoration in the Herzogstraße 8

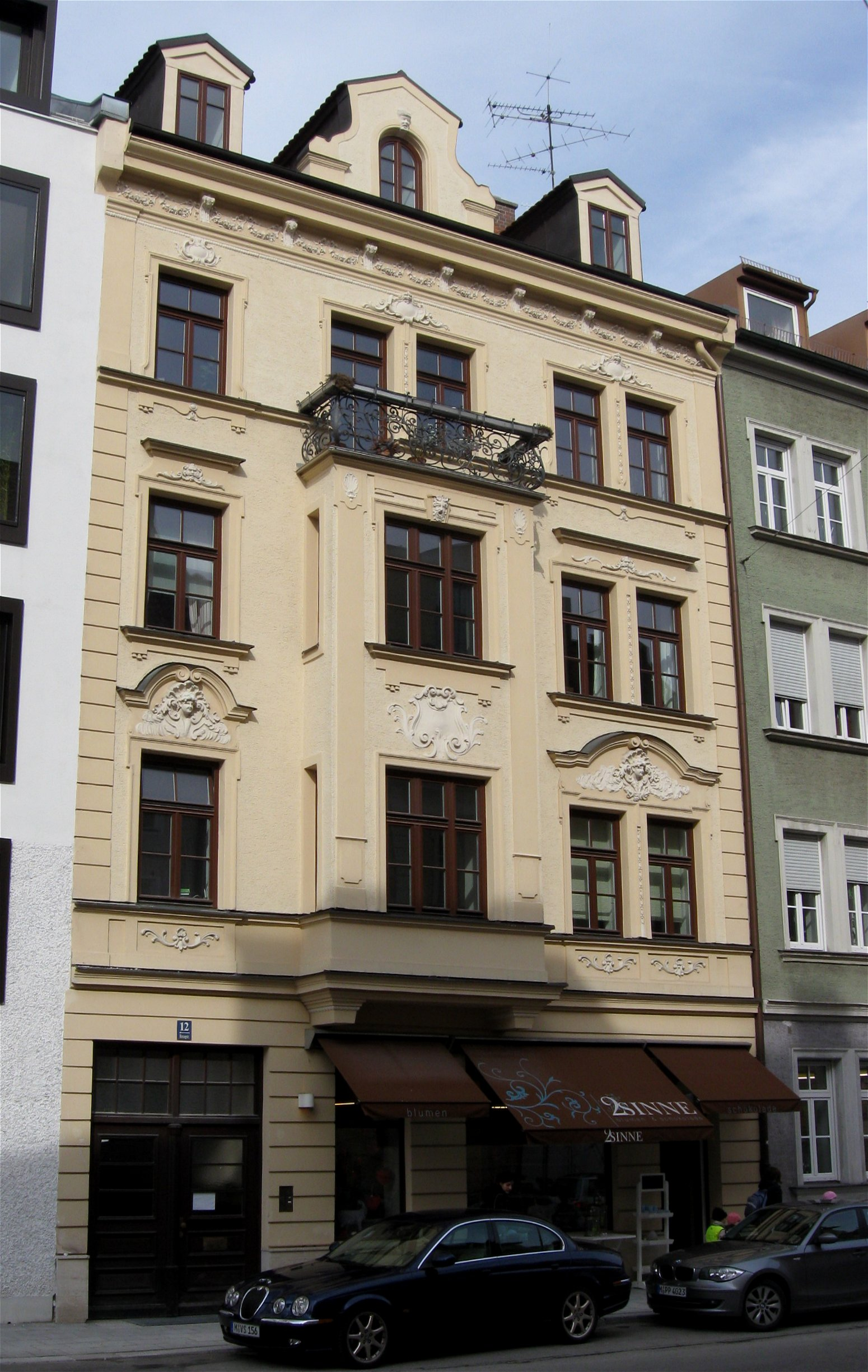
Built in 1895 by Jakob Baudrexel, a neo-baroque rental house with a bay window and rich stucco decoration in Herzogstraße 12

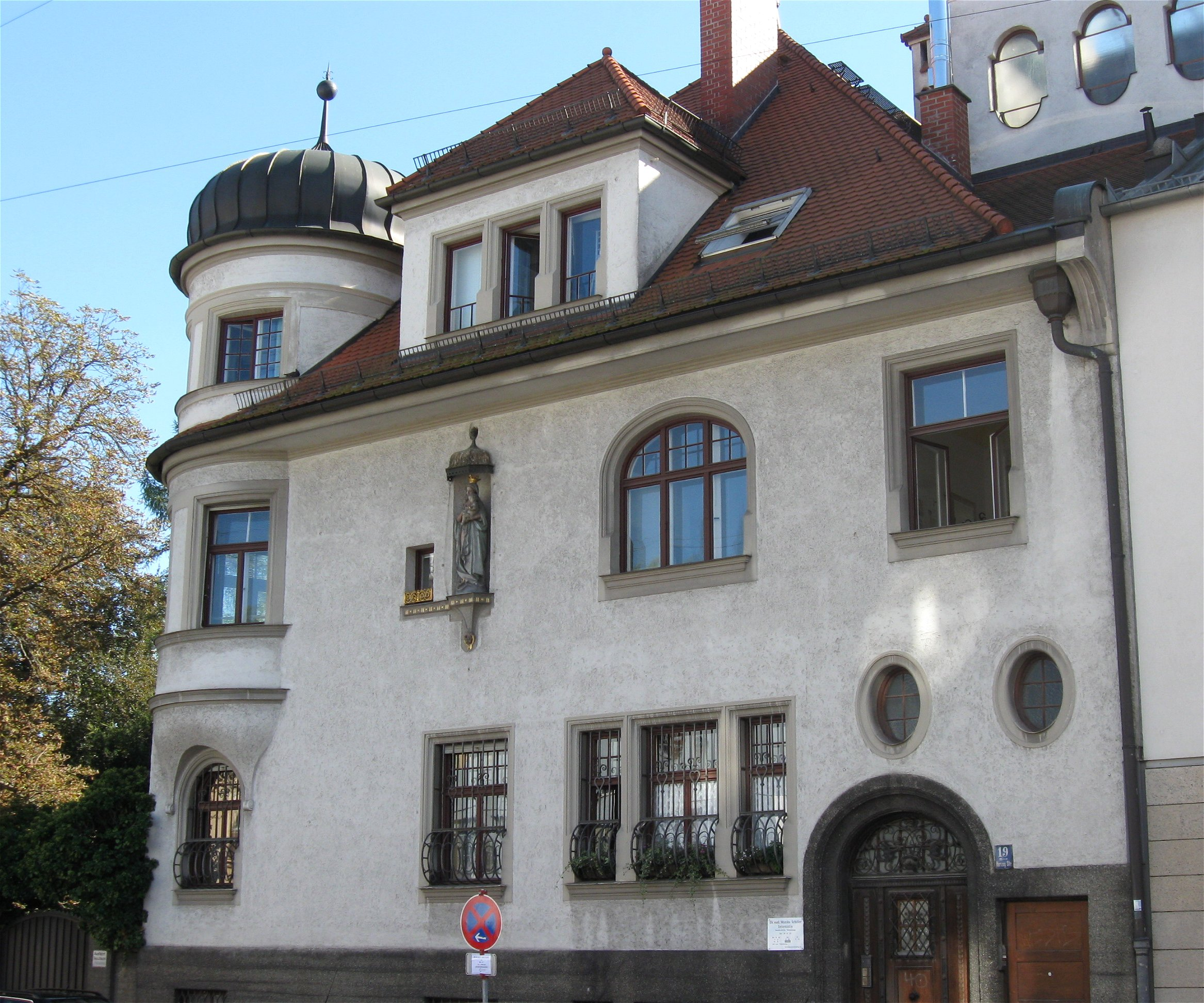
Villa built in 1908 by Karl Stöhr, in the modified German Renaissance style in the Herzogstraße 19

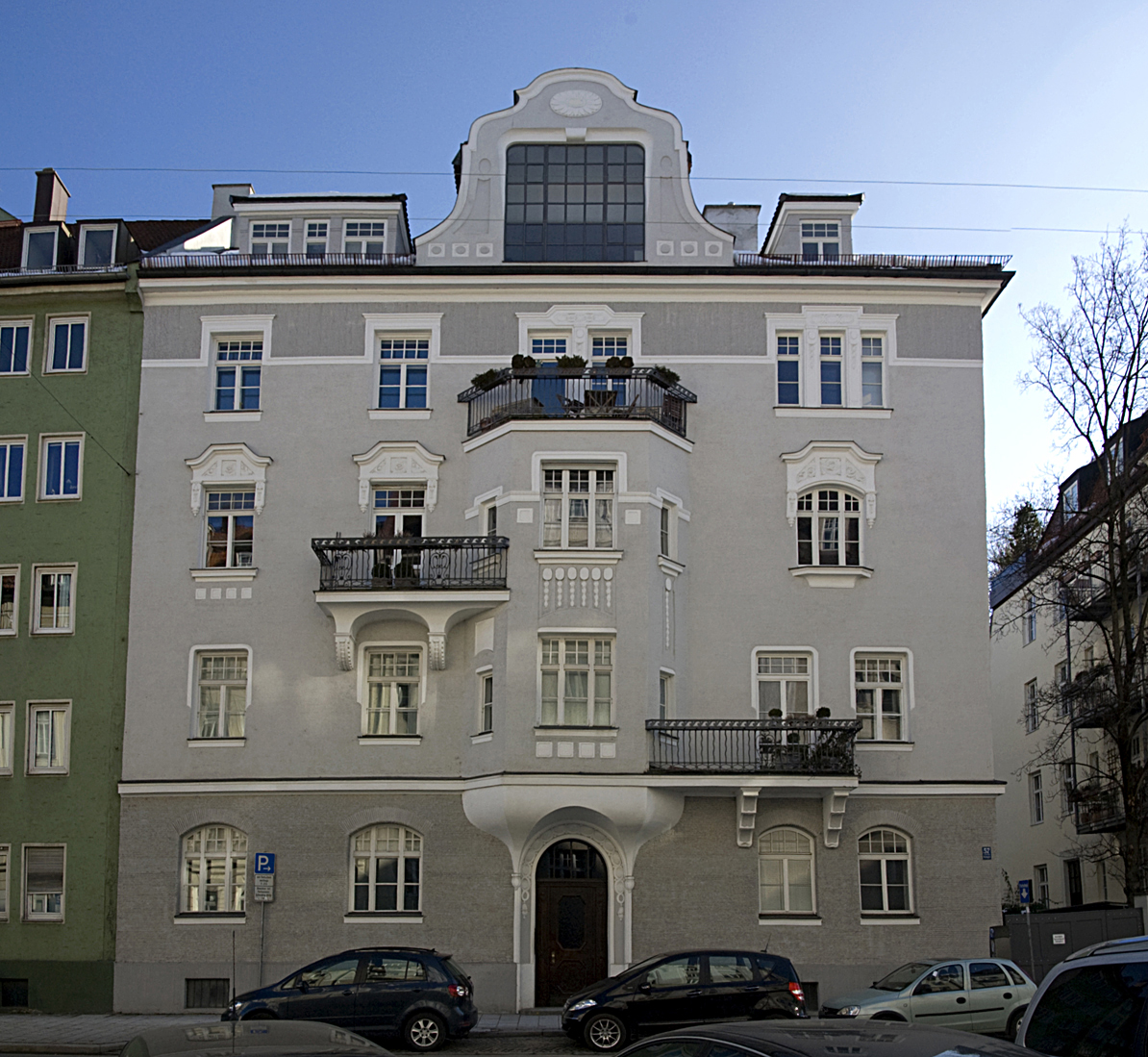
Art Nouveau building built in 1907 by Paul Breitsameter and Anton Wörz in Herzogstraße 57

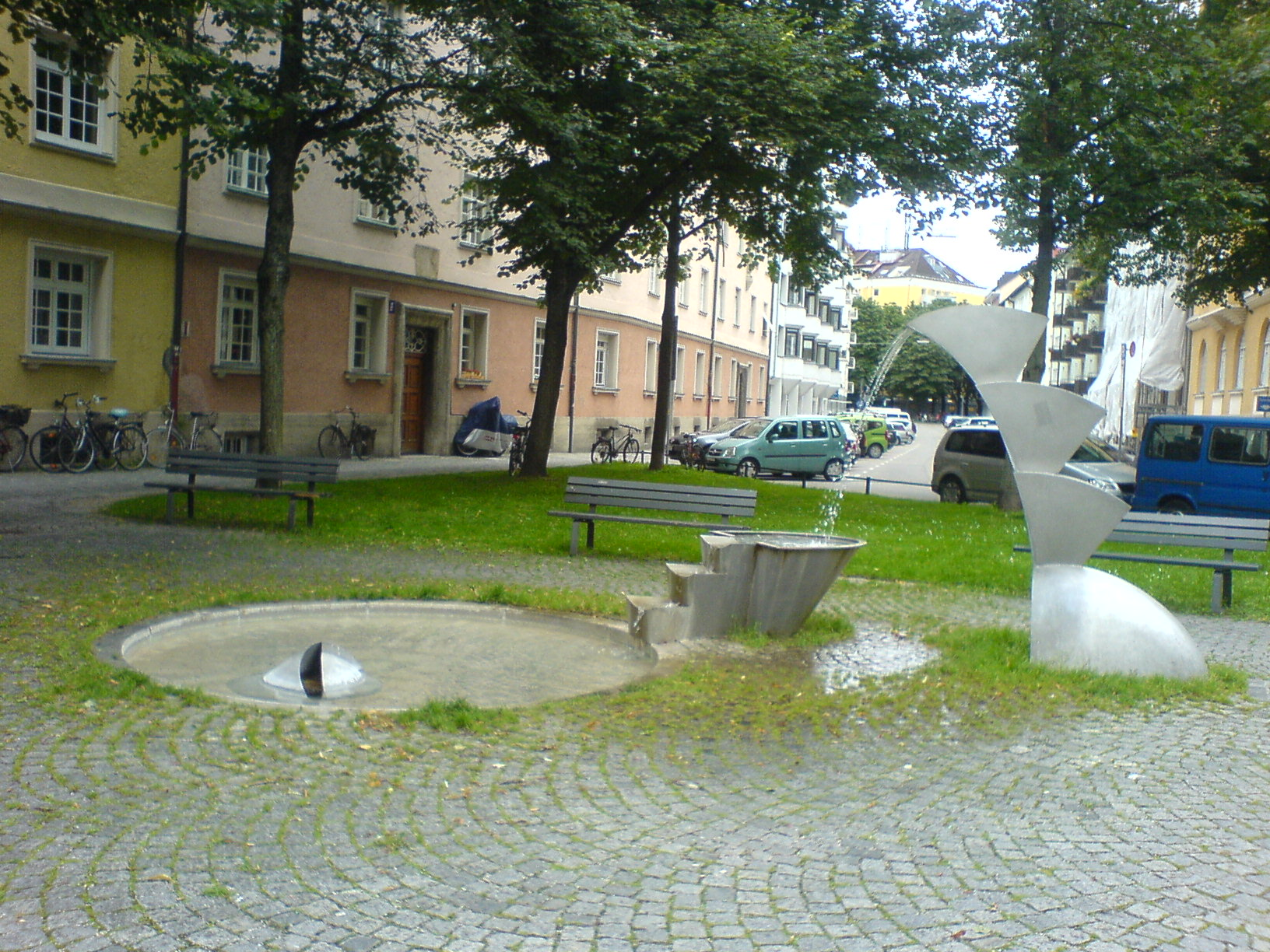
Fountain of Inga Ragnarsdóttir at Helmut Fischer Square

== Famous residents ==
In Herzogstraße 3, Júlia da Silva Bruhns lived with her daughters, her youngest son, and the mother of Thomas and Heinrich Mann from August 1898. The landscape painter, August Edler von Rüdt (born 1900 in Munich, † 1966 in Munich), son of the landscape painter August Edler von Rüdt and the coat of arms painter, Alexandra Noble von Rüdt had his studio in the Herzogstraße. The writer, Carry Brachvogel lived from 1910 until her deportation in 1942 in the Herzogstraße 55. Her brother, the historian Siegmund Hellmann received a professional and publication ban because of his Jewish origin in 1933 while the National Socialists were in power, therefore he moved in with his sister and lived there until 1942. In October 1914, the cinema "Odeon Lichtspiele" was founded in Herzogstraße 1, which was taken over in 1967 as "ABC-Kino" by Thomas and Steffen Kuchenreuther.

Andreas Baader, German terrorist of the late 1960s and 1970s, grew up with his mother together with a painter in the Herzogstraße. The director, Helmut Dietl lived in the mid-1960s in the Herzogstraße.

In 1967/68, the artist group Geflecht-Keller with Lothar Fischer, Heimrad Prem, Hans Matthäus Bachmayer, Reinhold Heller, Florian Köhler, Heino Naujoks, Helmut Rieger, Helmut Sturm and HP Zimmer, founded a studio in Herzogstraße. In 1975, twelve artists founded the "Kollektiv Herzogstraße", named after their joint studio there, with the aim of promoting the expressive abstraction of the artist groups CoBrA, SPUR and WIR: Heimrad Prem, Helmut Sturm, Hans Matthäus Bachmayer, Dietrich Bartscht, Heiko Herrmann, Thomas Niggl, Armin Saub, Diri (Dieter) Strauch and Heinz Weld. In contrast to the groups of the 1960s, Renate Bachmayer, Jutta von Busse and Ursula Strauch-Sachs were also included as female painters. Margit Krauss, who founded the folk-beat duo 'Peter & Margit' in 1968 with her former classmate Peter Maffay, also lived in Herzogstraße.

From 1978 to 1986, there was the Rigan Club in the Herzogstraße 82, where it came to live performances, of for example, The Searchers, The Marmalade, the Bay City Rollers, Nina Hagen and Mike Oldfield. In 1985, Franz Georg Strauss founded the private TV channel TV Weiß-Blau in Herzogstraße. Transregional resonance was also given to the cloud house of architect Walter Winkelmann at the corner of Siegfried- /Herzogstraße, as a Hippie center in the early 1970s, the outer walls were painted entirely with clouds.
