= Winzererstraße =

Street in Munich, Germany

The Winzererstraße is a two-kilometer-long street in the Munich districts of Maxvorstadt and Schwabing.

== Description ==
The Winzererstraße starts at the Hessstraße at the Massmannspark and runs almost parallel to Schleissheimer Straße, the road ends today in the North, after crossing the Ackermannstraße, southeast of the Olympiaberg.

There are 11 architectural monuments, such as, the barracks building of the Prinz-Leopold-Barracks or the Obelisk in the triangle Winzererstraße / Lothstraße / Georgenstraße.

The Bavarian Ministry of Labor, Social Affairs, Family and Integration is located on Winzererstraße 9, the Munich Wood Research (Technical University of Munich) is located on Winzererstraße 45, the Munich Department of Finance is located at Winzererstraße 47a, the City Archive is located at Winzererstraße 68, an outside office of the Federal Office of Freight Transport can be found in house number 52, and the Higher Labor Court and the Munich Labor Court are located at Winzererstraße 106.

== History ==
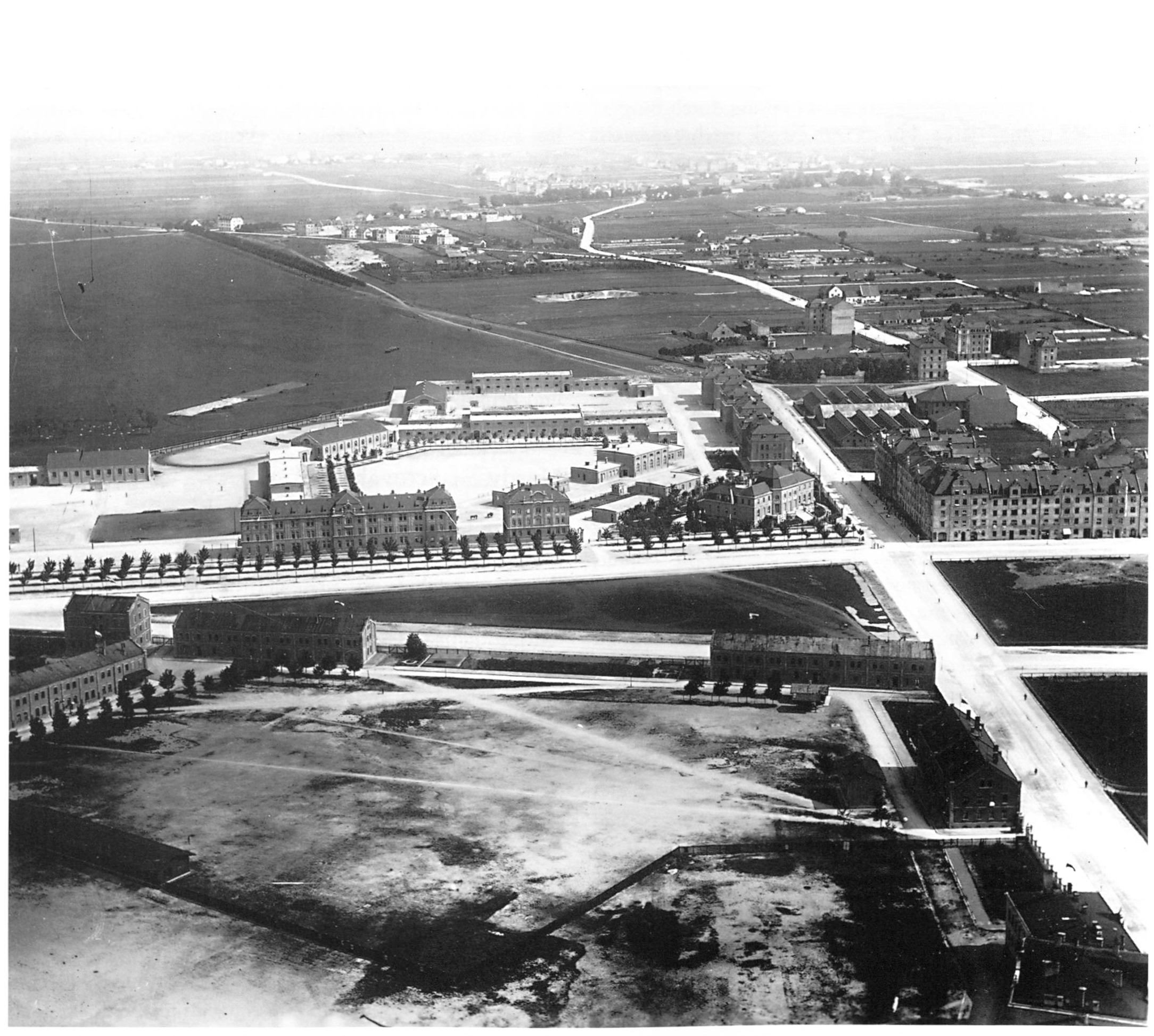
Aerial photo from 1900

The street is named after the knight and Landsknecht leader Winzerer, which in 1525 prevented the encroaching of the peasant wars on Bavaria. It runs on a part of the Oberwiesenfeld.

Starting in 1902, the Bavarian army occupied the Prinz-Leopold-Kaserne. The casino ("Offizierspeiseanstalt") at Winzererstraße 41 - in the 1980s, until a fire, was temporarily used as a chemical factory - was later a popular film site, for example by director Rainer Werner Fassbinder or for Schimanski-Tatorts. At that time, the filmmakers had simply completed the arduous walls for the shooting with papier-mâché and the like.

Around 1905, it found itself, between the Lothstraße and the Elisabethstrasse, which had not yet been fully developed, along the Winzererstraße existing building portion so the 1. Pionier battalions barracks, in which part of the Oberwiesenfeld barracks was found east of the Infanteriestraße. At that time, Winzererstraße had already been extended to Herzogstraße, but not asphalted.

North of Herzogstraße, in 1941, just south of the later amassed Schuttberg, which later became the Olympiaberg, the diary Nordmolkerei Deller KG was founded, and until the end of the 1990s was still in operation. In the year 2000, the diary was demolished and the residential complex at the Olympiapark was built.

After 1946 to 1992, the Winzererstraße formed, between Lerchenauer Straße and Lothstraße, the border between the municipalities of Schwabing-West and Neuhausen-Oberwiesenfeld.

It was only with the construction of Ackermannstraße in the late 1960s, that the northern part of Winzererstraße (from the height of house number 89) to the Lerchenauer Straße was paved, as part of the construction measures for the 1972 Summer Olympics.

In the 1970s, the access road from Lerchenauer Straße to the Winzererstraße was closed for cars. Later, the sub-area below the Olympiaberg was converted, from the present residential complex at the Olympiapark to the Lerchenauer Straße, so that the road ends at the level of the residential complex.

1980 until 1981, an 11-meter-long tree trunk section from Africa was set up for research purposes at the Wood Institute on Winzererstraße 45.

Since 1996, the Winzererstraße between Lerchenauer Straße and Ackermannstraße forms the border between the municipalities of Schwabing-West and Milbertshofen-Am Hart.

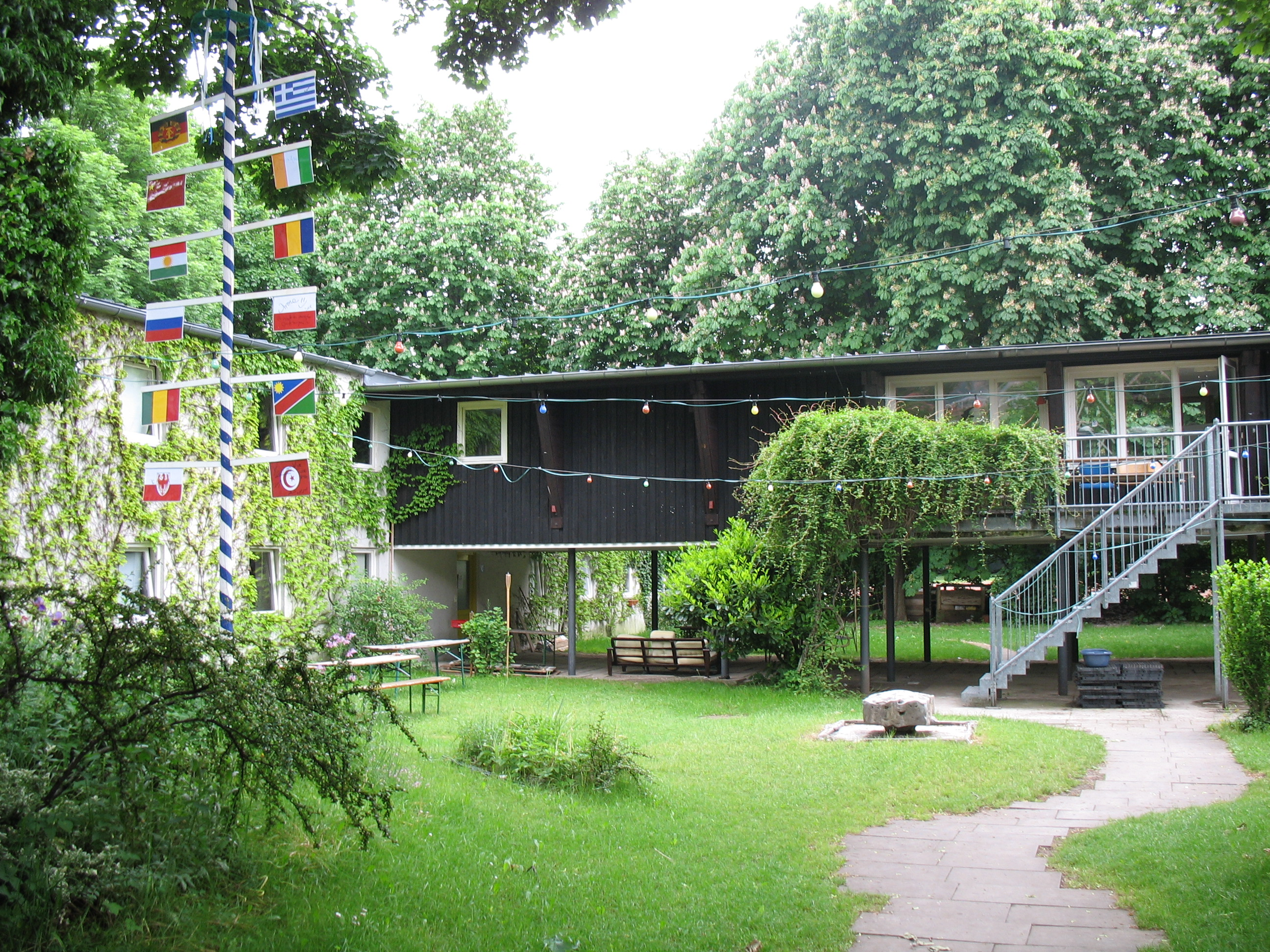
Residential Dormitory of Maßmannplatz

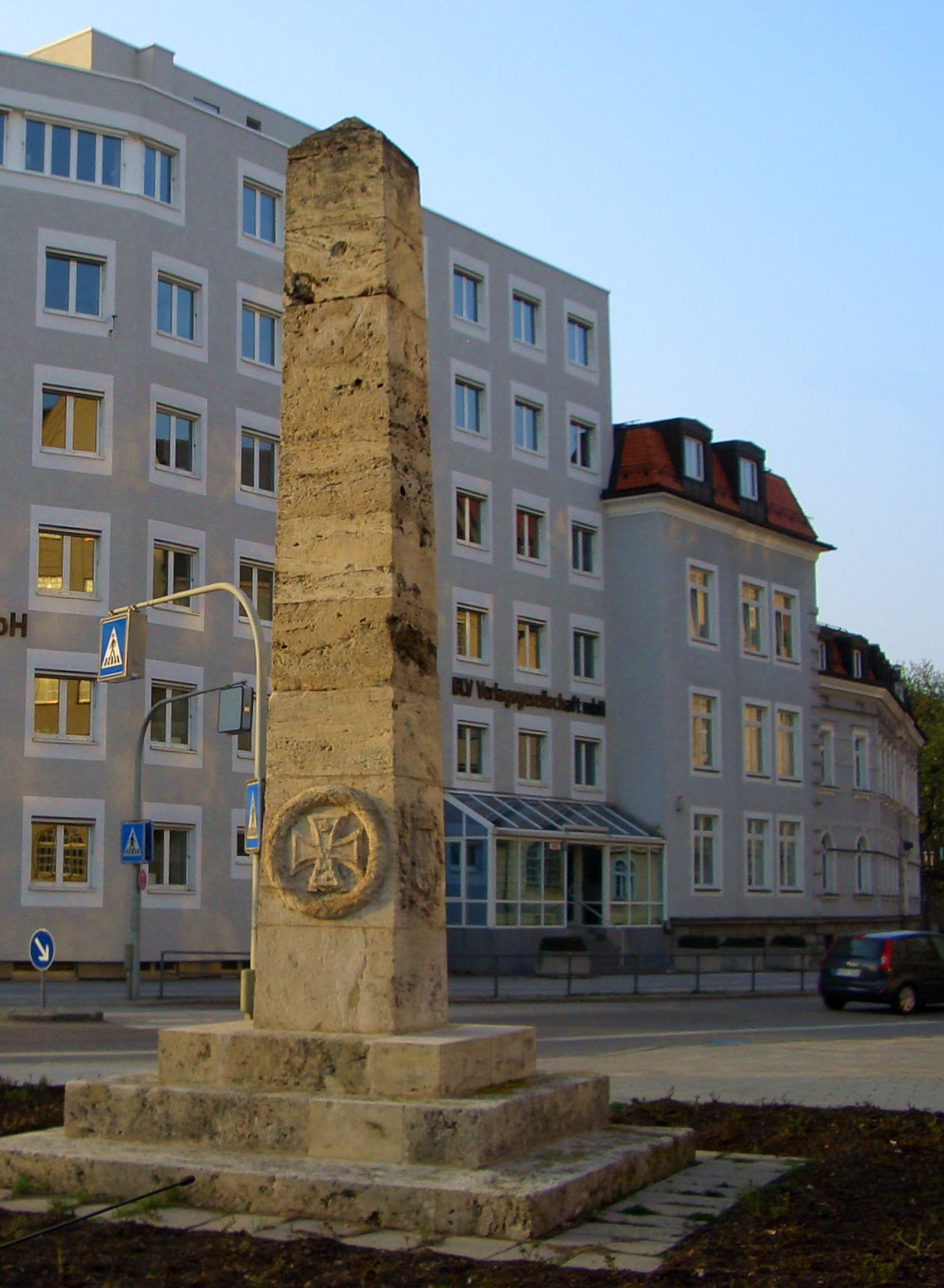
Oblisik in the triangle Winzererstraße / Lothstraße / Georgenstraße

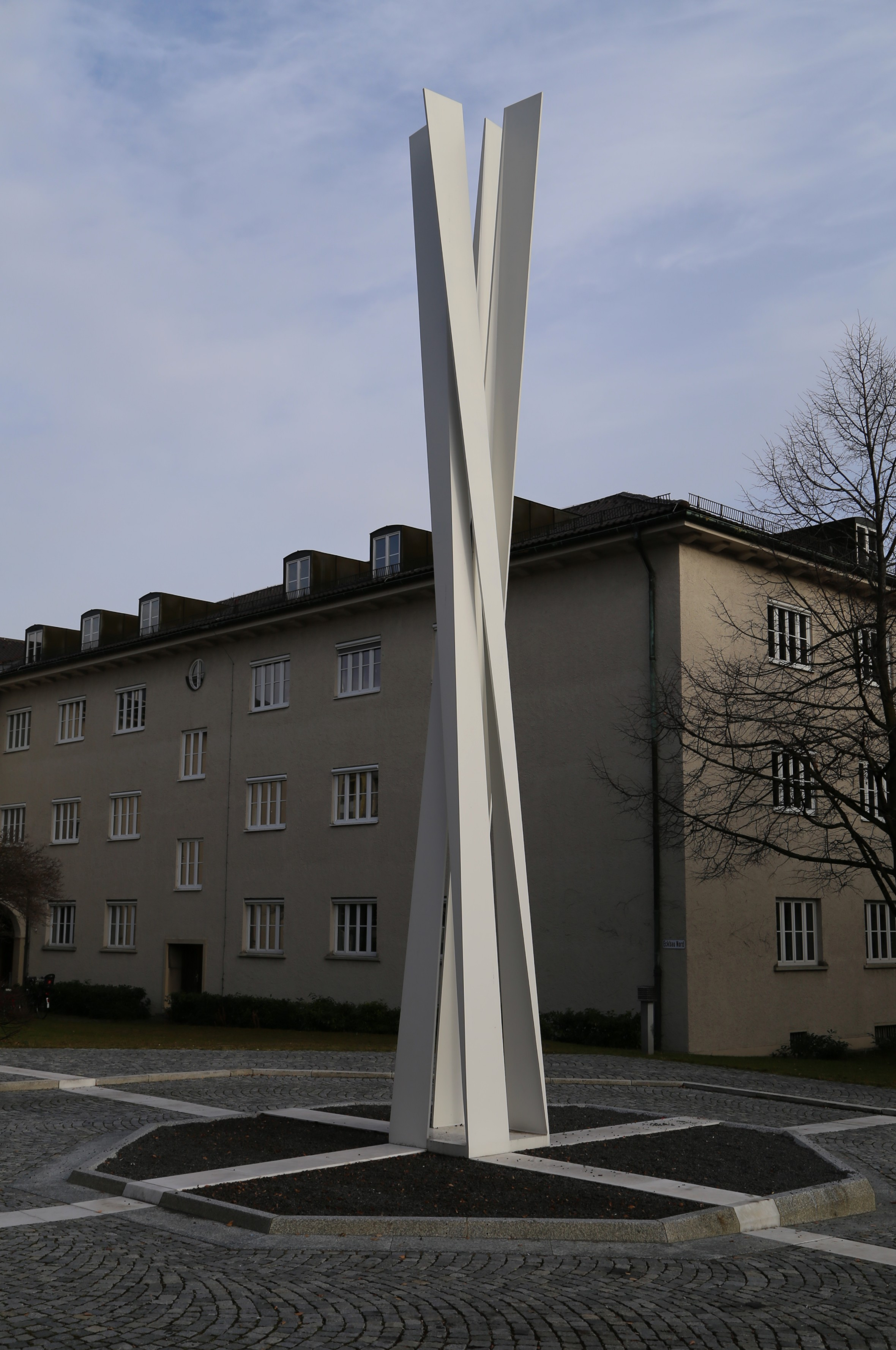
Stele diagonal (1986) by Ben Muthofer

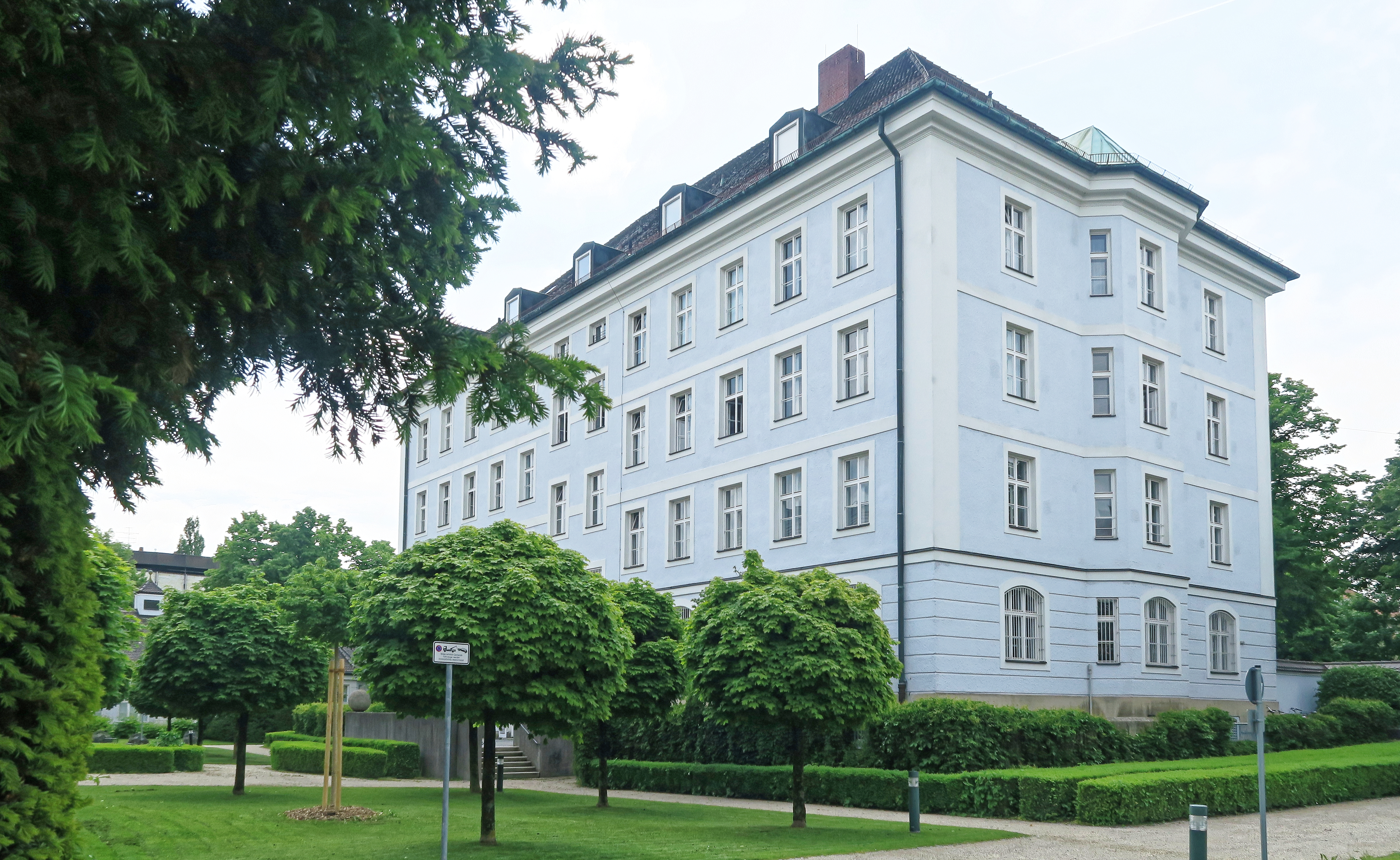
Munich City Archives, Winzererstraße 68

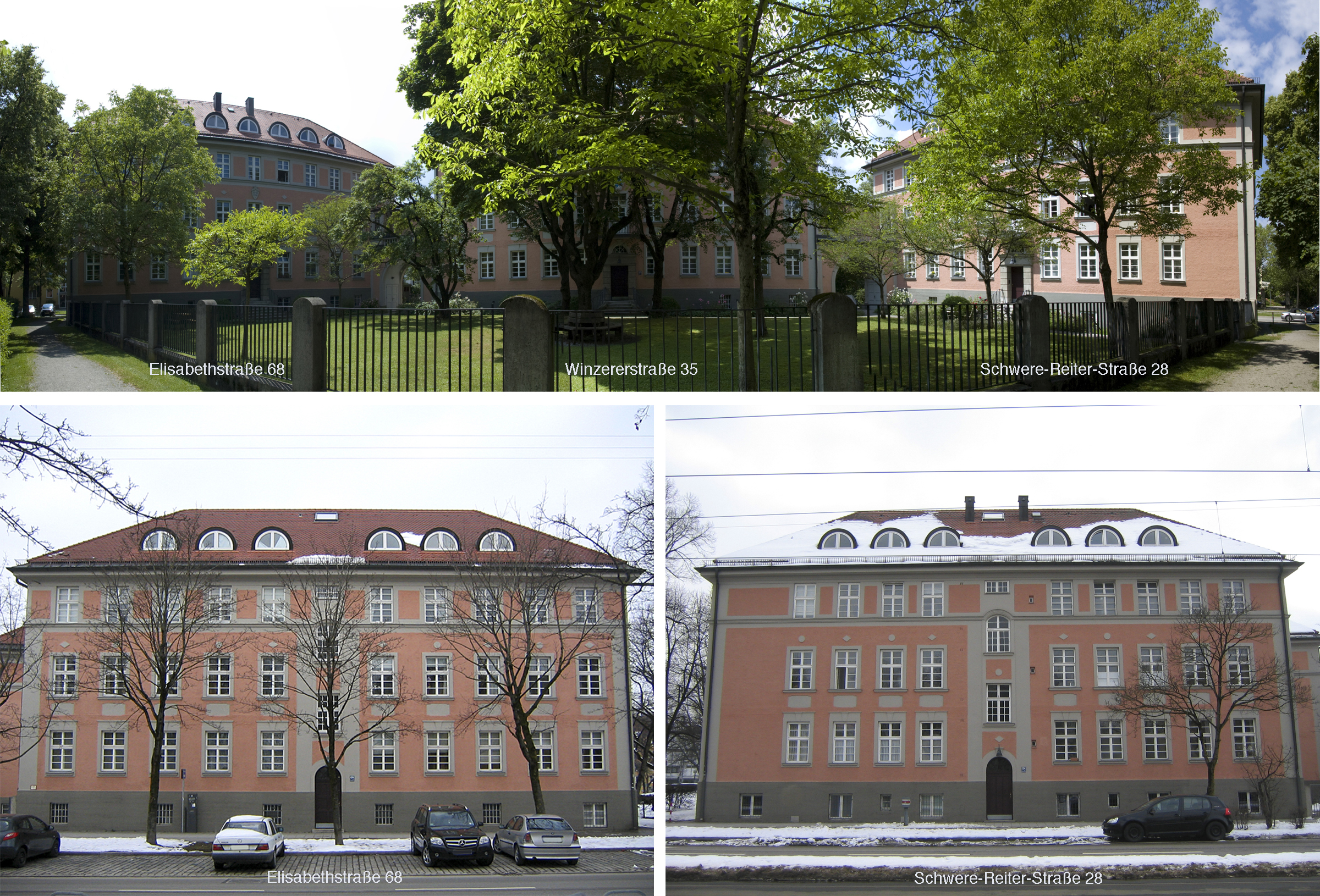
Baroque residential building in Winzererstraße 35

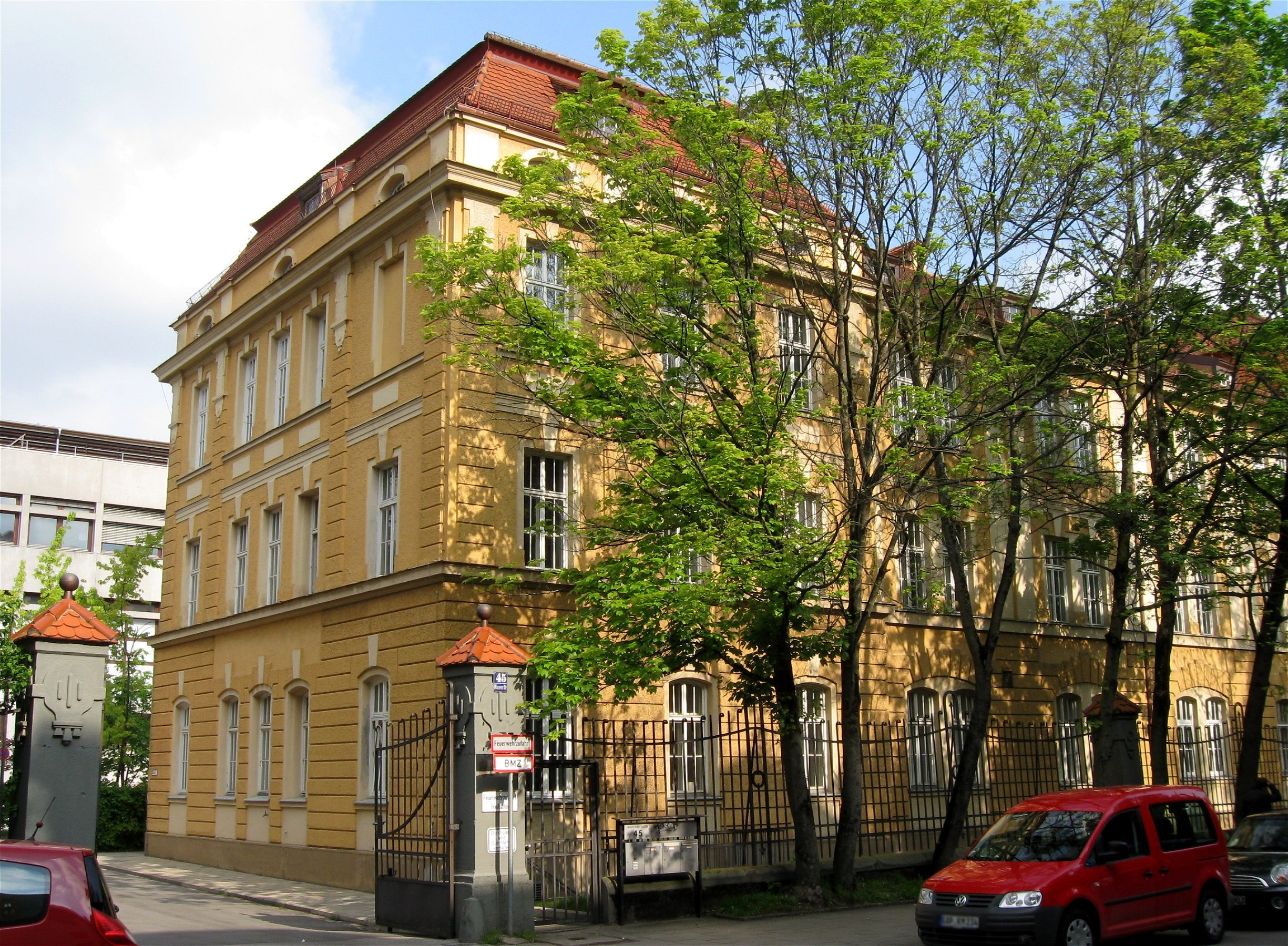
Barracks building Winzerstraße 45

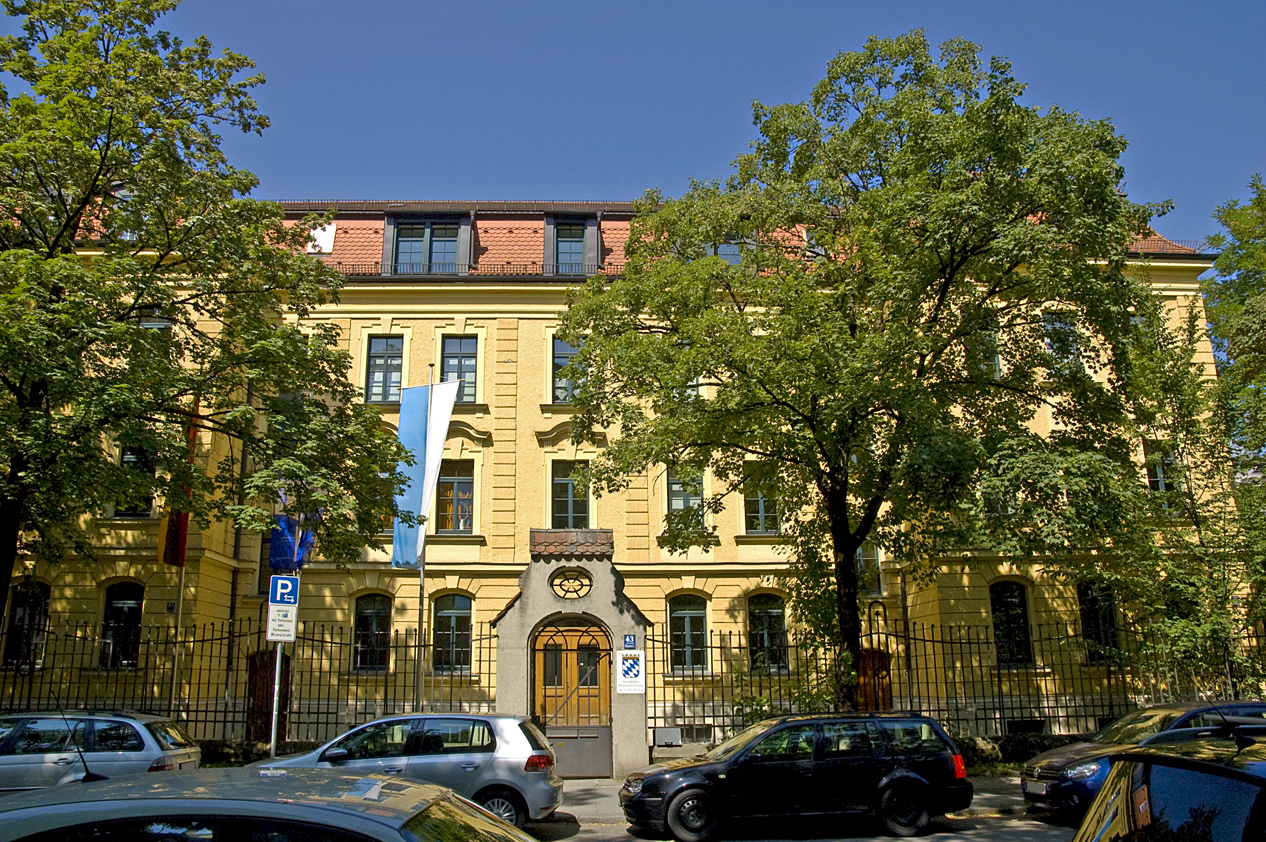
Barracks building, former part of the Prinz-Leopold-Kaserne in Winzererstraße 43

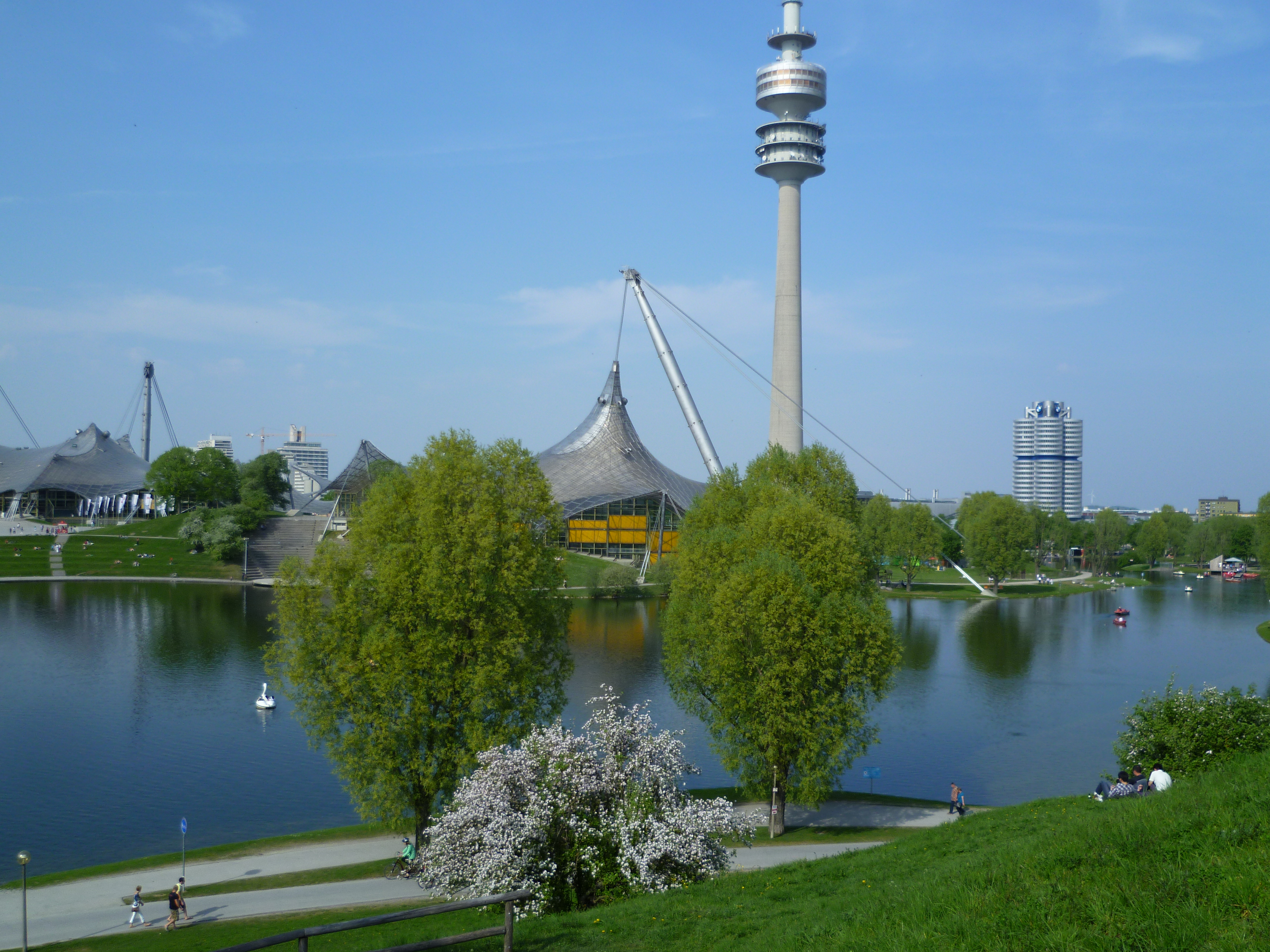
Olympiapark
