= Lothstraße =

Street in Munich, Germany

Lothstraße is a roughly 1.3 kilometer long street in Munich. It runs through the St. Benno district and forms the boundary between the municipality of Maxvorstadt, which lies southeast of the street, and the districts of Neuhausen and Schwabing-West, which are located northwest.

== Description ==
It runs from Nymphenburger Straße (house number 1 or 2) to Winzererstraße (number 29 or 54). From Linprunstraße to Thorwaldsenstraße, the Lothstraße forks off and forms a green triangle, a branch then leads to Nymphenburger Straße.

== Buildings ==
On Lothstraße is the Zeughaus München, the back of the Deutsches Herzzentrum München (German Heart Center Munich) (now Lazarettstraße 36), the Munich University of Applied Sciences and its library, and the Forschungsinstitut für Wärmeschutz (Research Institute for thermal insulation). Since 1975, the Bayerische Blindenhörbücherei e.V. (Bavarian library for blind people) at Lothstraße 62, and in the Lothstraße 29, the Deutsche Landwirtschaftsverlag (German Agricultural Publishing house).

In Lothstraße is the war memorial of the 2. Bayerischen Infanterie-Regiment, and at the intersection with the Dachauer Straße is a measuring station of the Umweltbundesamt (Federal Environmental Agency).

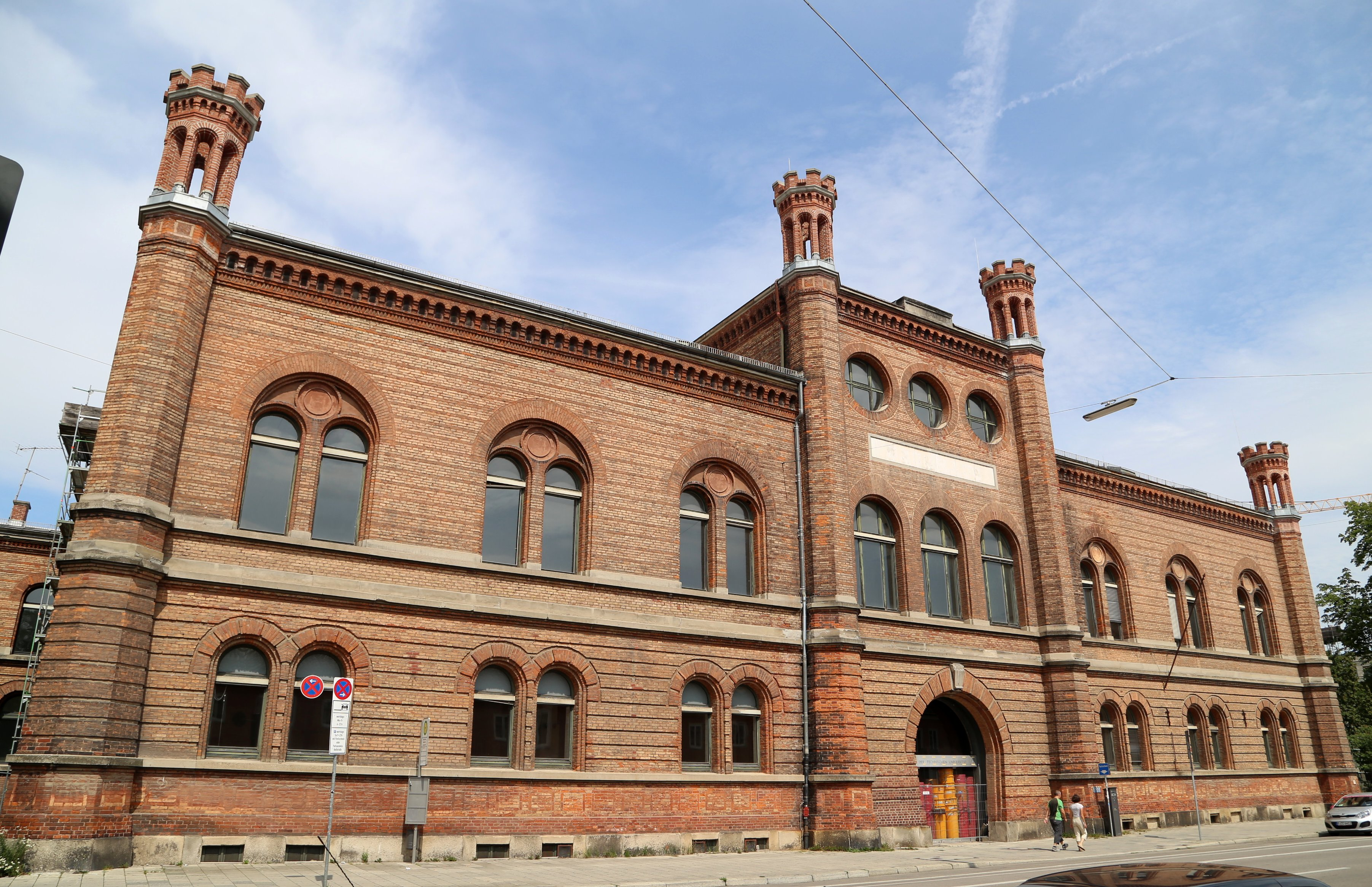
Lothstraße 17: Zeughaus München (1861–1865)

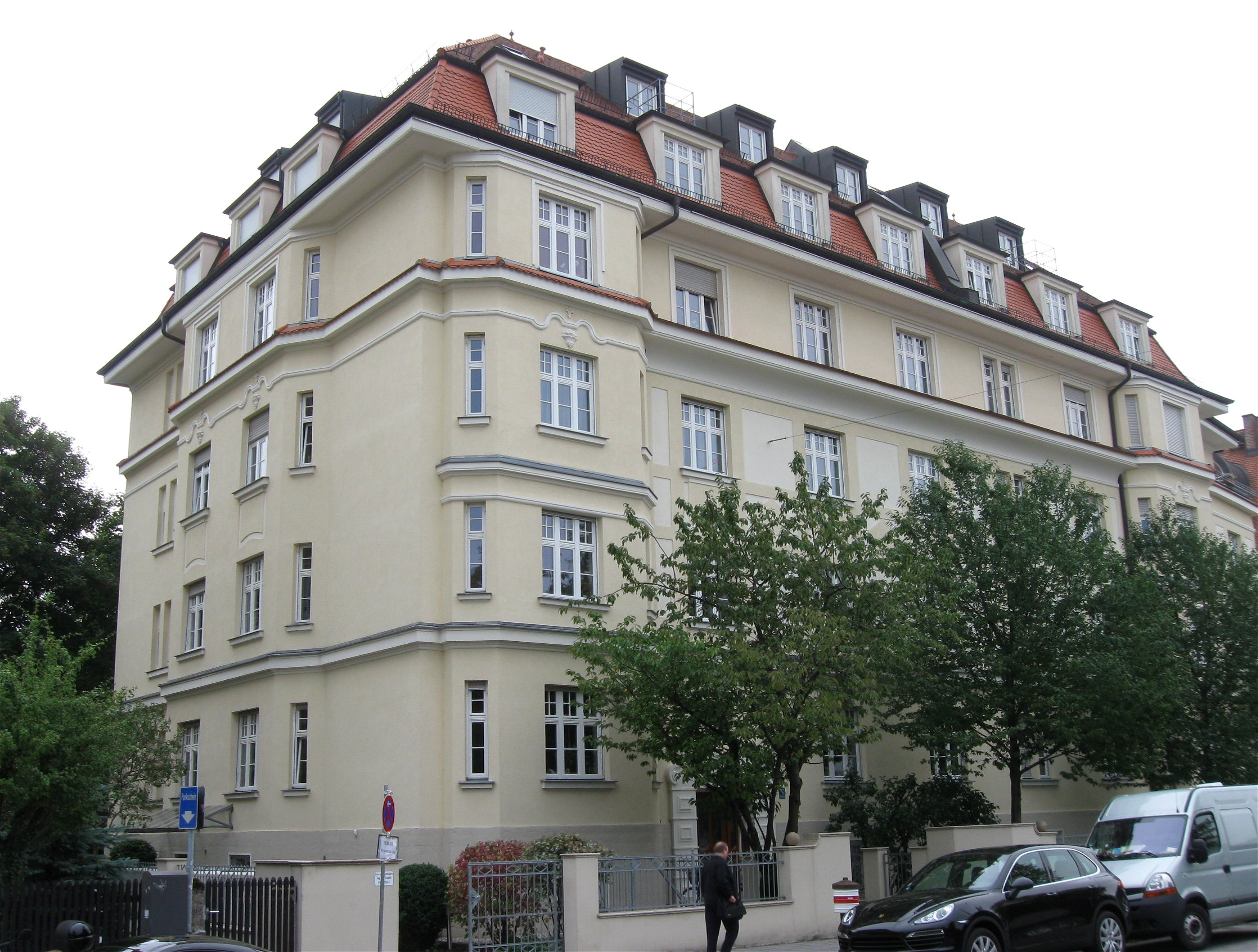
Lothstraße 28 (1910)

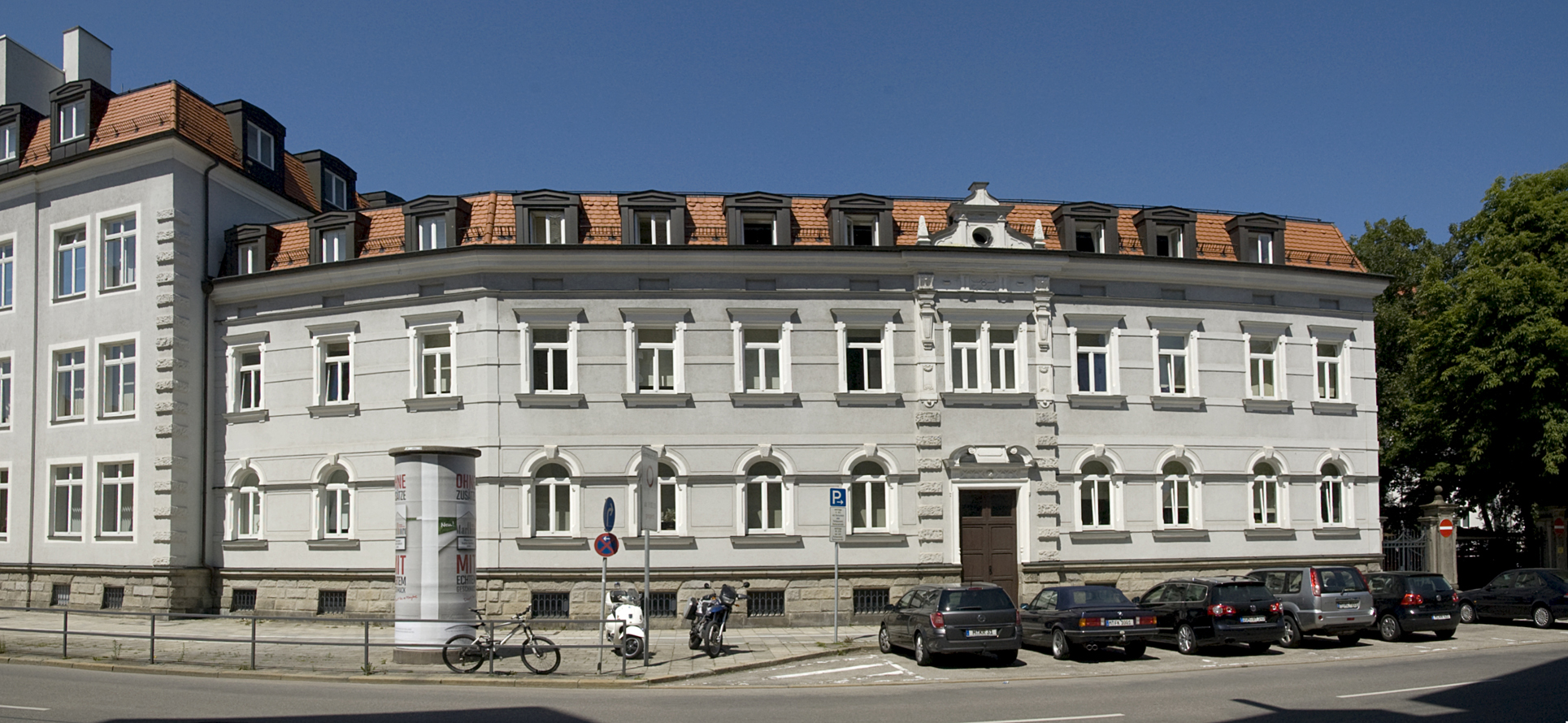
Lothstraße 29: North wing of the former officer's casino of the 2. Bayerischen Infanterie-Regiment (1898)

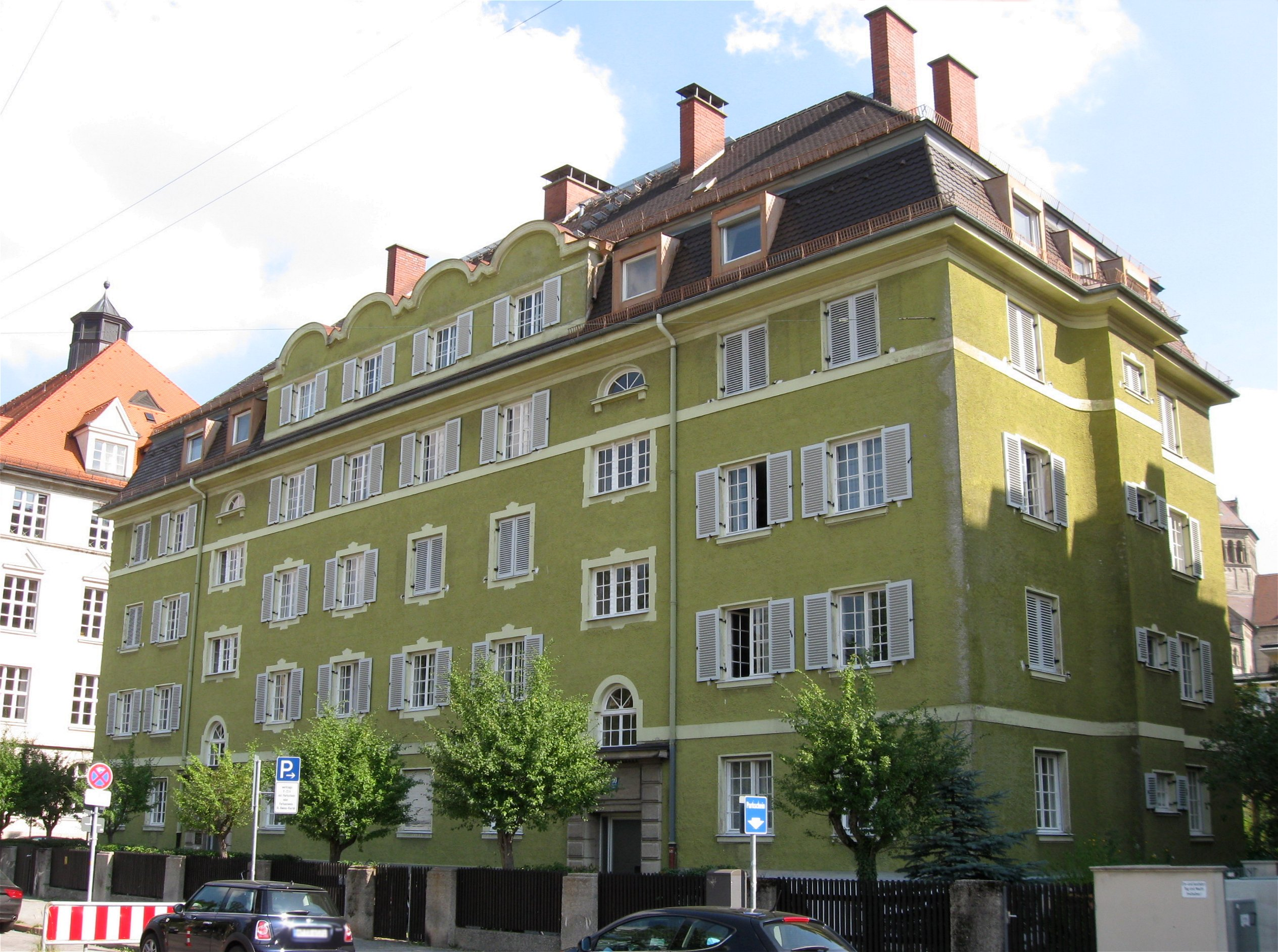
Lothstraße 30-32 (1920/21 by Franz Deininger)

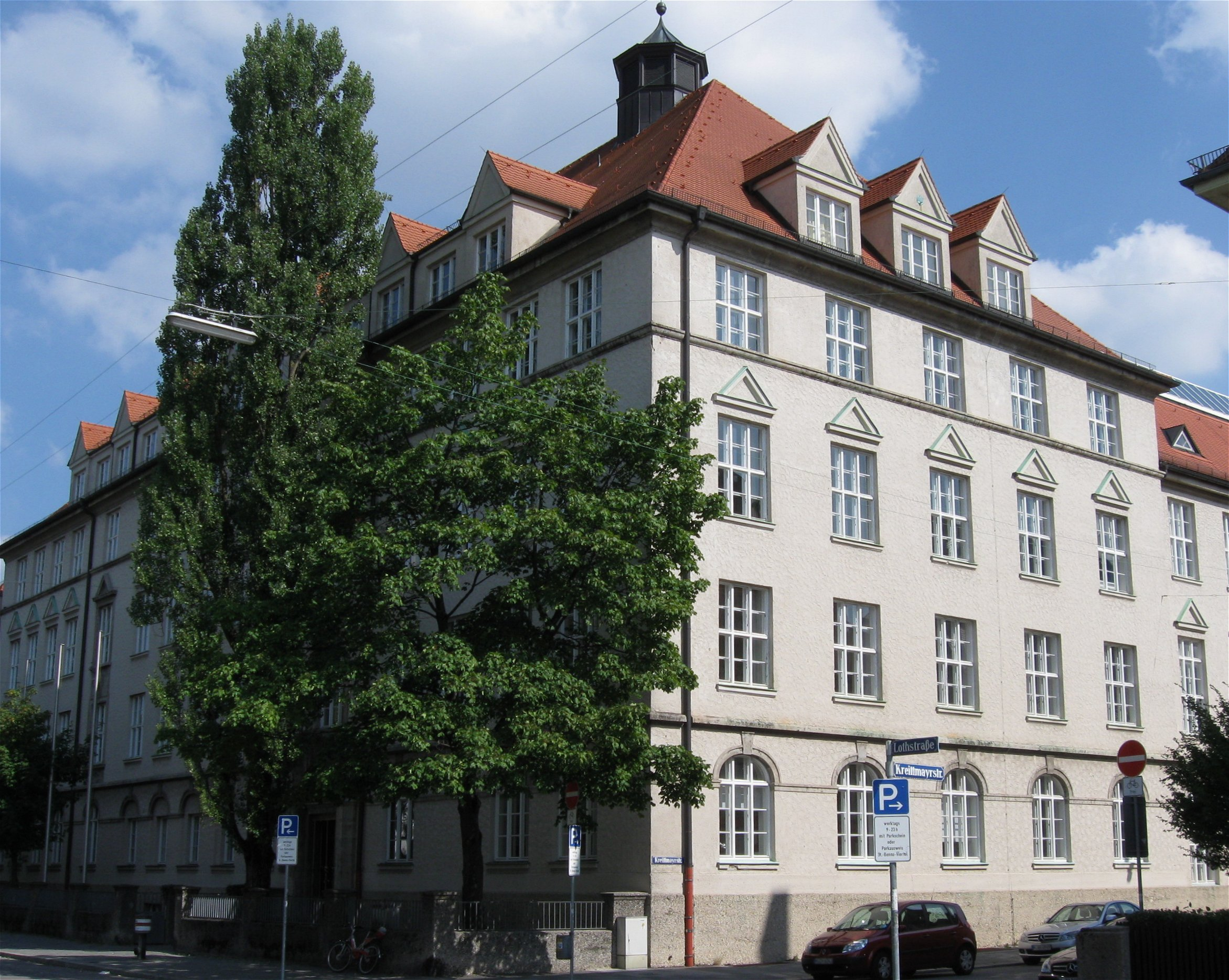
Lothstraße 34: Oskar-von-Miller-Polytechnikum (1925–26 by Karl Meitinger)

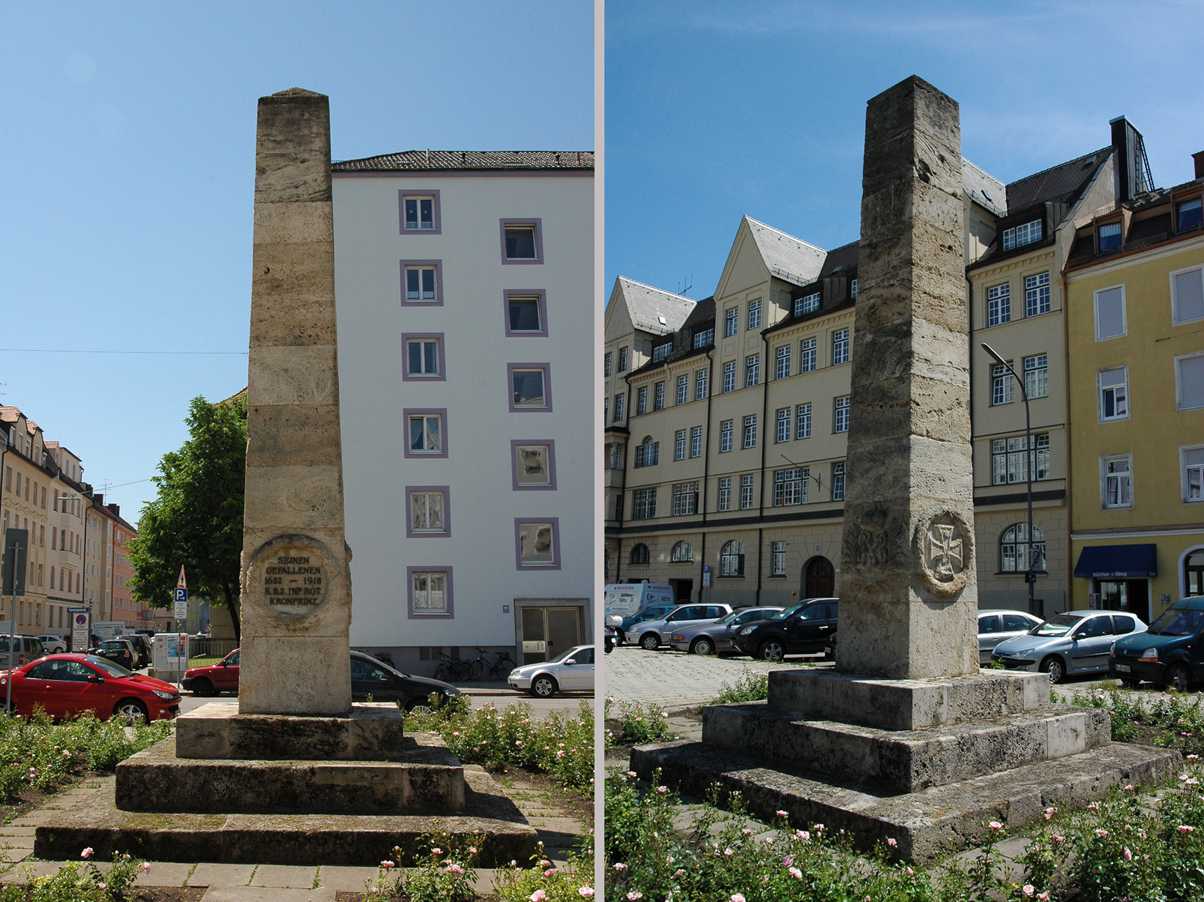
War Memorial of the 2nd Bavarian Infantry Regiment (Obelisk, 1923 by Herman Broxner)

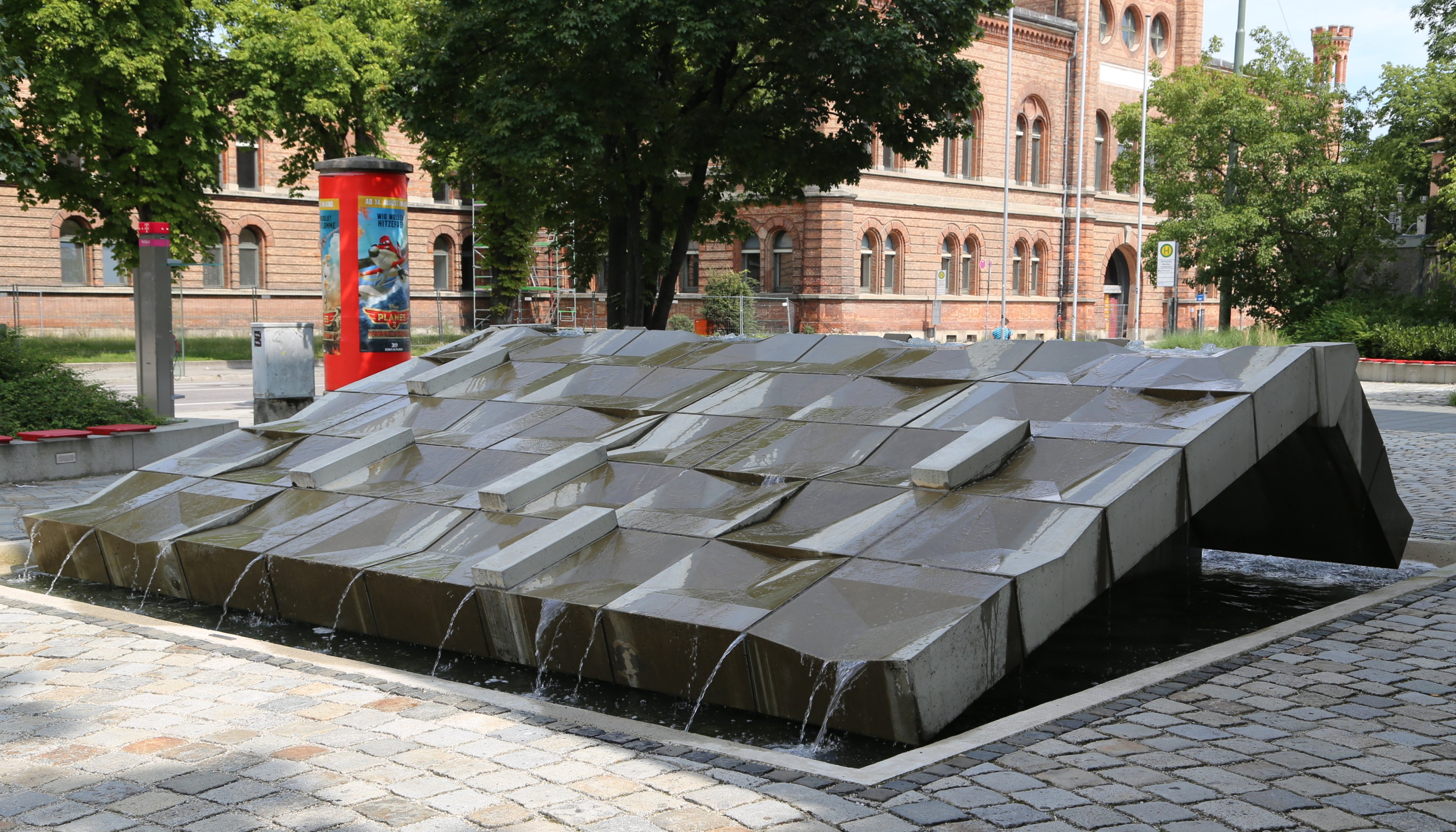
Step fountain on the corner Lothstraße 62 / Dachauer Str. 98

== Campus Lothstraße ==
The Campus Lothstraße of the Munich University of Applied Sciences is its largest location and includes all central administrative units, nine faculties and the CAREER Center, the e-learning center, the further education center and the Open University of Upper Bavaria (OHO). Which are located directly in buildings on Lothstraße:

- Lothstraße 13d: Central Library and Mensa
- Lothstraße 17: the Zeughaus is being renovated for use by the university
- Lothstraße 21: the so-called "W-Bau", including workshops, studios and student rooms
- Lothstraße 34: Supply Engineering, Process Engineering, Printing and Media Technology (FK 05) and Applied Sciences and Mechatronics (FK 06)
- Lothstraße 64: Electrical Engineering and Information Technology (FK 04), Computer Science and Mathematics (FK 07) and Industrial Engineering (FK 09)

2004, the so-called Roter Würfel was completed in the Lothstraße 64, which has since then also become a landmark anchored in corporate design of the University of Applied Sciences.

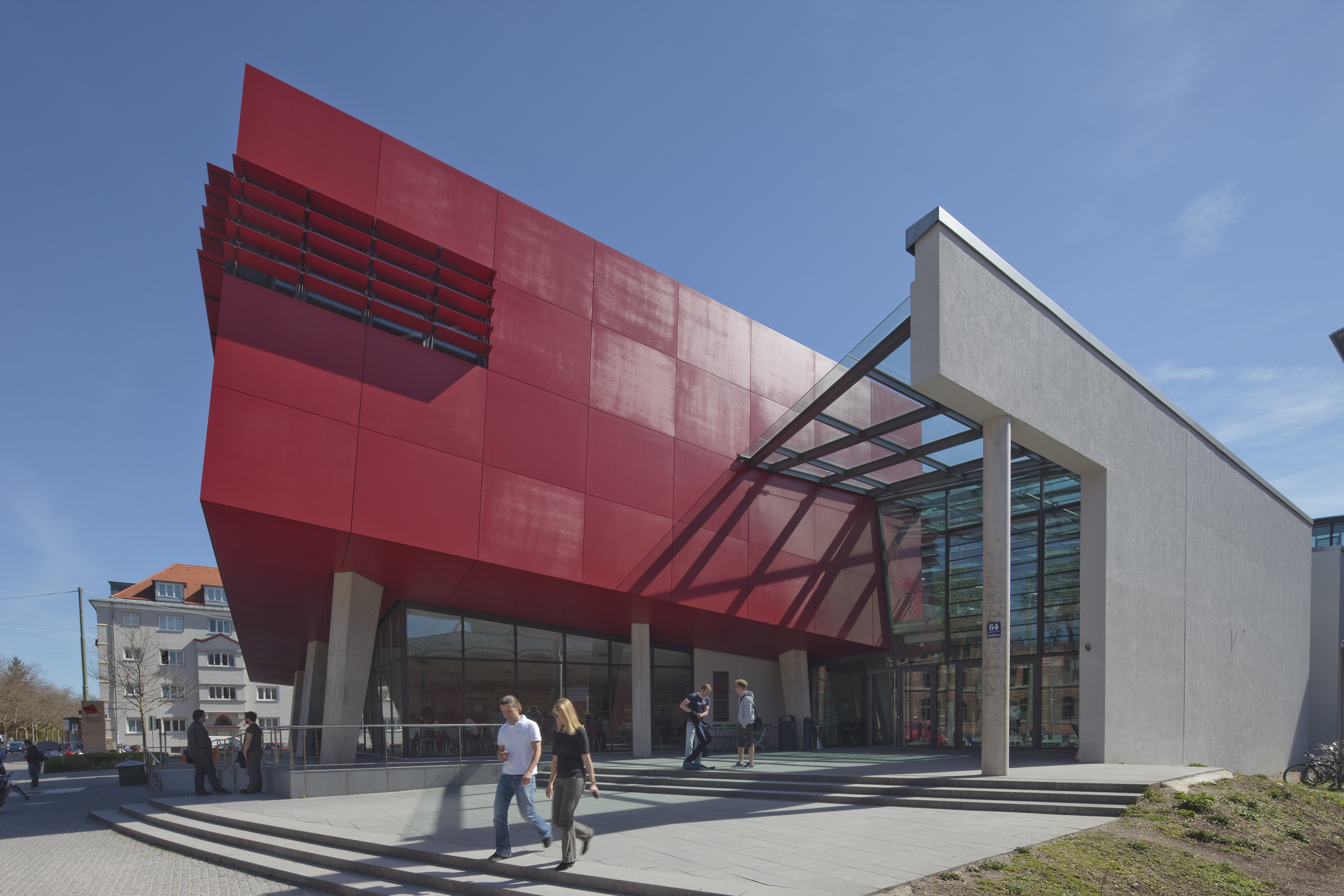
Roter Würfel of the University of Applied Sciences

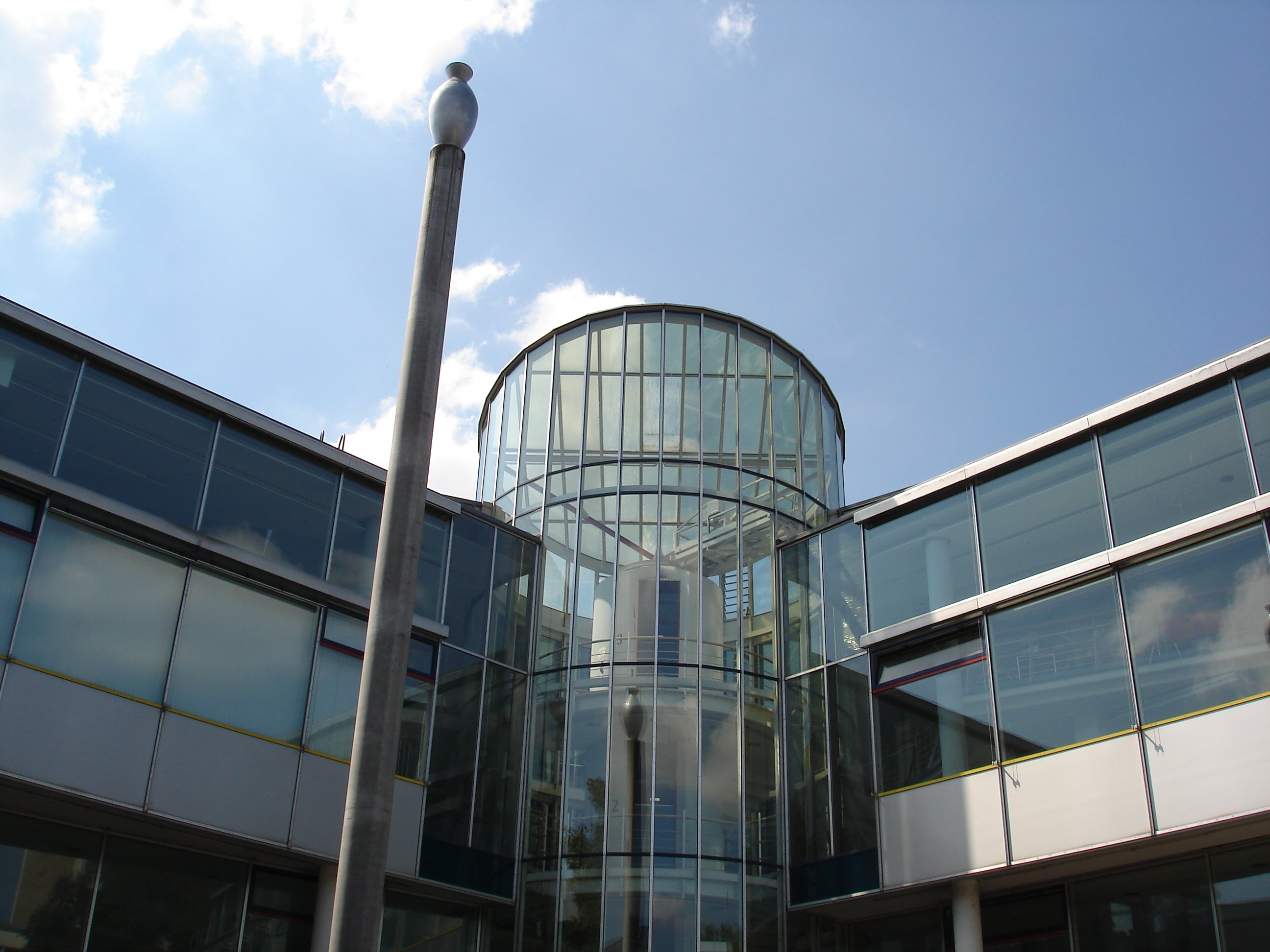
Library of the University as seen from Lothstraße

== History ==
The street was named in 1877 after the Bavarian court painter Johann Ulrich Loth. Towards the end of the 19th century, it formed the southeastern boundary of the Barackenkasernements Oberwiesenfeld.

From 1879 to 1904 the Bayerisches Armeemuseum was housed in the Zeughaus in Munich, before it moved into the newly built monumental building in the Hofgarten, the present state chancellery.

Adolf Hitler lived during his affiliation to the infantry in the Lothstraße 29 and stayed there officially until 1 May 1920. From the Führergeburtstag (Birthday of Adolf Hitler) 1934 until denazification in 1945, the barracks in Lothstraße therefore held the name Adolf-Hitler-Kaserne.

== Transportation access ==
The tram lines 20 to 22 and the city bus 153 have a stop at the Munich University of Applied Sciences with the name Lothstraße.
