= Cazal Eyewear =

German sunglasses company

- Industry: Fashion
- Founded: 1975
- Products: Ophthalmic Goods
- Services: Ophthalmic Goods Merchant Wholesalers; Ophthalmic Goods Manufacturing

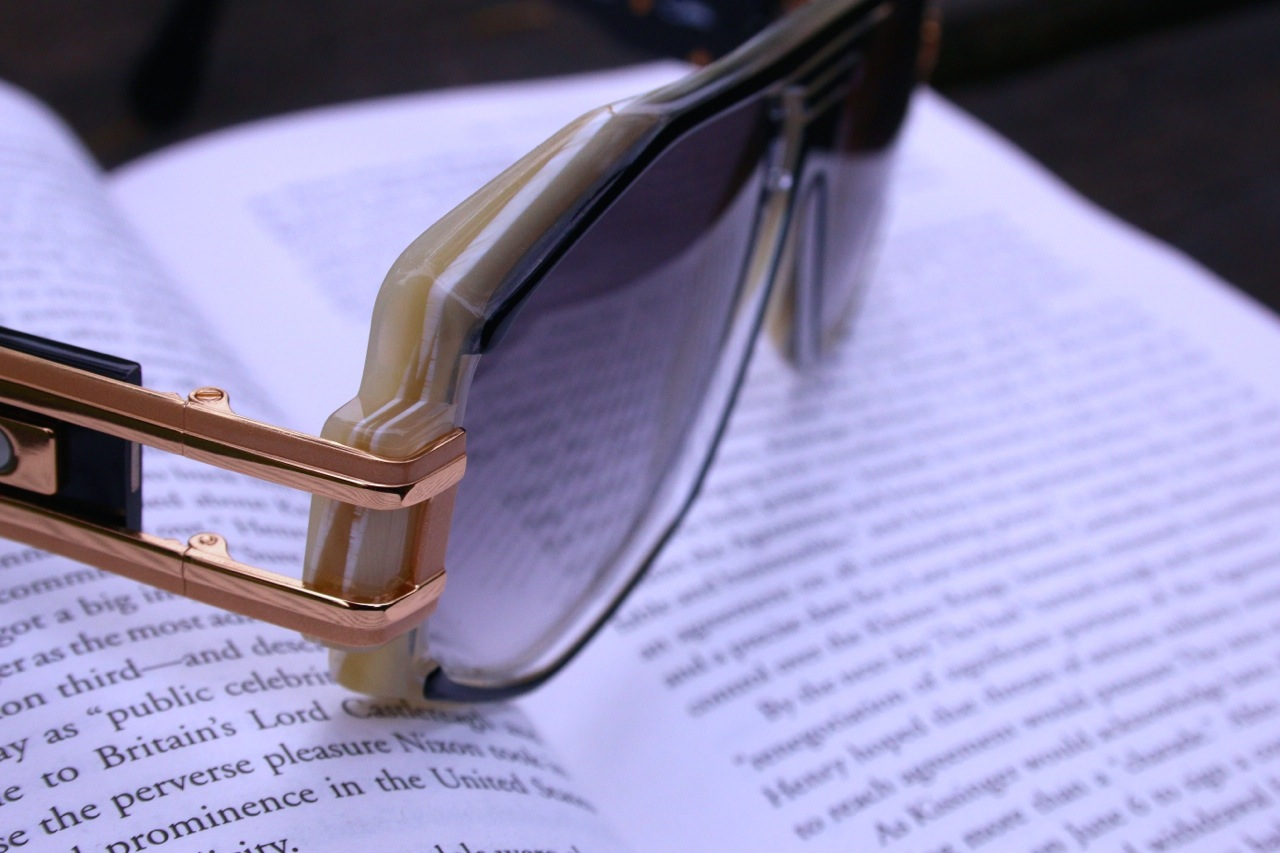
Cazal Legends 163

Cazal is a luxury sunglass designing and manufacturing company based in Germany and created by Cari Zalloni in 1975.

== History ==
Cari Zalloni founded Cazal in 1975 with his business partner Günter Böttcher. Zalloni wanted to make sunglasses with mismatched lenses, a design detail that recently became popular at Virgil Abloh's Spring/Summer 2021 show for Louis Vuitton. Reportedly, the sunglasses are worn by Hussein bin Talal, the former King of Jordan, and Hosni Mubara, the former president of Egypt.

Imports in the USA started by the end of the 1970s. With their heavy gold nose piece and temple pieces, Cazals became iconic in the hip hop culture of the 1980s, the cause of many street muggings, and later considered a key memorabilia of the early hip hop era. Cazal sunglasses were worn by hip hop artists Run DMC, the Fat Boys, Jay-Z, LL Cool J, Rick Ross (who has a facial tattoo of the Cazal logo), and Will.I.Am. Spike Lee wore the 616 style in the film She's Gotta Have It. In 1985, a Philly rap group named the Cazal Boys made a song called Snatchin Cazals.

The company introduced more frames in 2015.
