= Cari Zalloni =

Creator and Designer of Cazal Eyewear

Cari Zalloni (20 August 1937 – 3 July 2012) was an Austrian designer. He is the creator and chief designer of Cazal Eyewear, an eyewear brand.

== Early life and background ==
Cari Zalloni was born in Athens, Greece. His father was of Greek-Italian descent, while his mother was from Austria. His father died in 1947, while Cari was still a young boy, which led his mother to take him to Austria where he grew up.

== Career ==
Cari Zalloni's design career started in 1960 after studying design at the Academy of Applied Arts in Vienna. He initially designed furniture in Siena, Italy until 1962 when he moved to Germany to design decorative glassware.

In Germany, he launched his 'Cazal' eyewear brand in 1975 with entrepreneur Günter Böttcher. Cazal's designs have been referred to as "distinctive, fashion-forward frames." The name 'Cazal' originated by combining the first syllables from his first name (CAri) and last name (ZALloni).

== Death ==
Zalloni died in 2012 following complications from heart surgery.
