= Munich University of Applied Sciences =

Public university in Munich, Germany

- Hochschule für angewandte Wissenschaften München
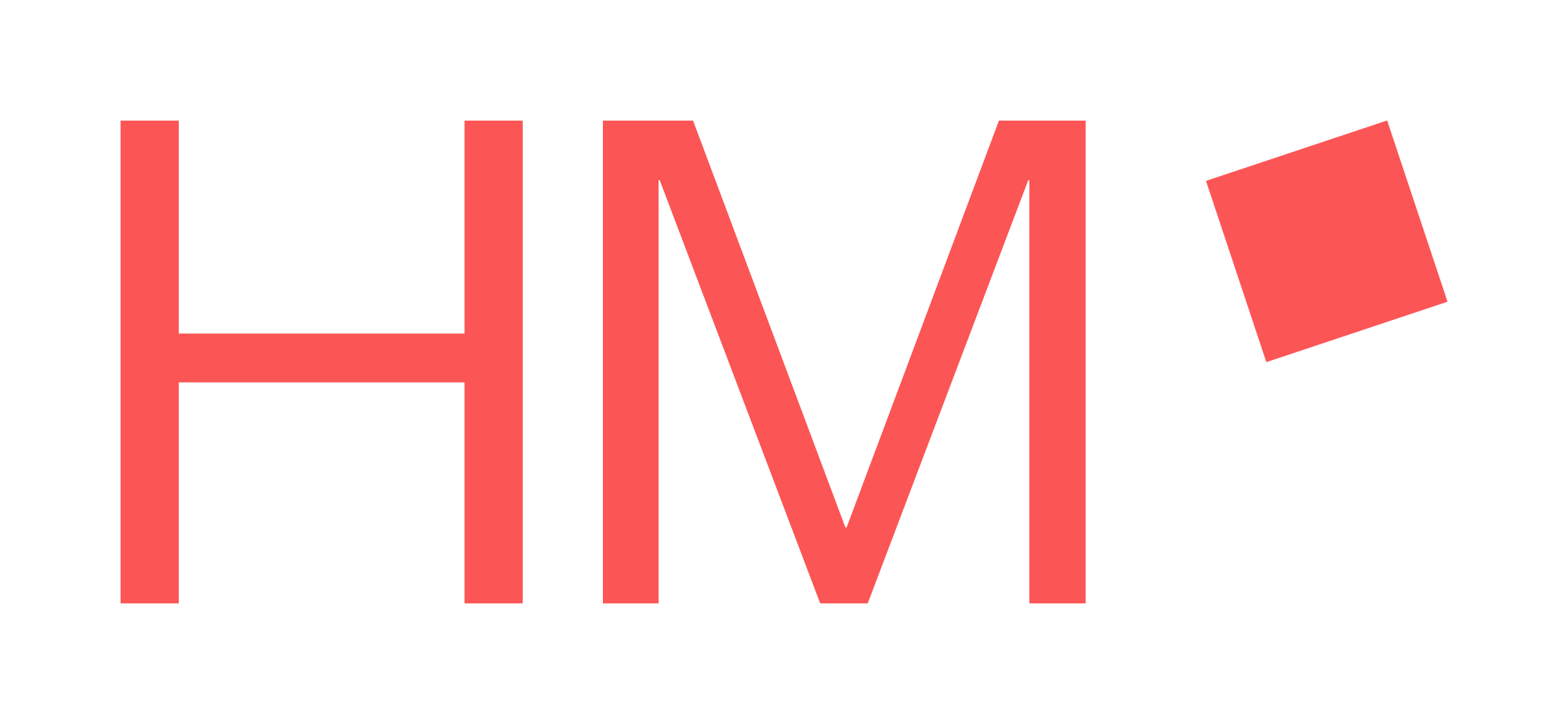
- Type: Public
- Established: 1971
- President: Martin Leitner
- Faculty: approx. 1,200 (500 full professors)
- Students: 17,841
- Location: Munich, Bavaria, Germany
- Campus: Urban, 3 campuses
- Website: hm.edu

The Munich University of Applied Sciences (HM) (German: Hochschule für angewandte Wissenschaften München) is the second largest university of applied sciences in Bavaria with about 18,000 students.

The university was established in 1971 through the merger of seven colleges of technology and higher education, some of which were founded as early as the early 19th century.

HM is also a member of the UAS7 (Seven Universities of Applied Sciences) network that forms a strategic alliance of seven leading German Universities of Applied Sciences in teaching and research.

== Overview ==
In the winter semester 2022/23, 18,386 students were enrolled at the Munich University of Applied Sciences (39.3% female, 60.7% male). There are 510 professors, about 700 part-time lecturers, and 511 non-academic staff in its 14 faculties. International students make up 13% of the student body.

The university has over 80 degree programmes in the fields of natural sciences/engineering, business, social sciences and design. It is spread over several locations. In addition to the main complex on Lothstraße/Dachauer Straße, there are also Pasing on the western outskirts of Munich and Karlstraße near the city centre.

Martin Leitner was elected President of the Munich University of Applied Sciences in 2016 and re-elected for a second term of office from 2020. The Executive Board (university management) includes the three Vice Presidents Klaus Kreulich (responsible for teaching), Sonja Munz (responsible for research) and Thomas Stumpp (responsible for economics) as well as the Chancellor Jörg Finger (responsible for administrative management, legal matters, the budget and construction matters, among other things). Together with the Presidential Board, the central bodies (University Council, Senate, Extended University Management and Faculty Council) decide on university and state matters.

== History ==
=== Background ===
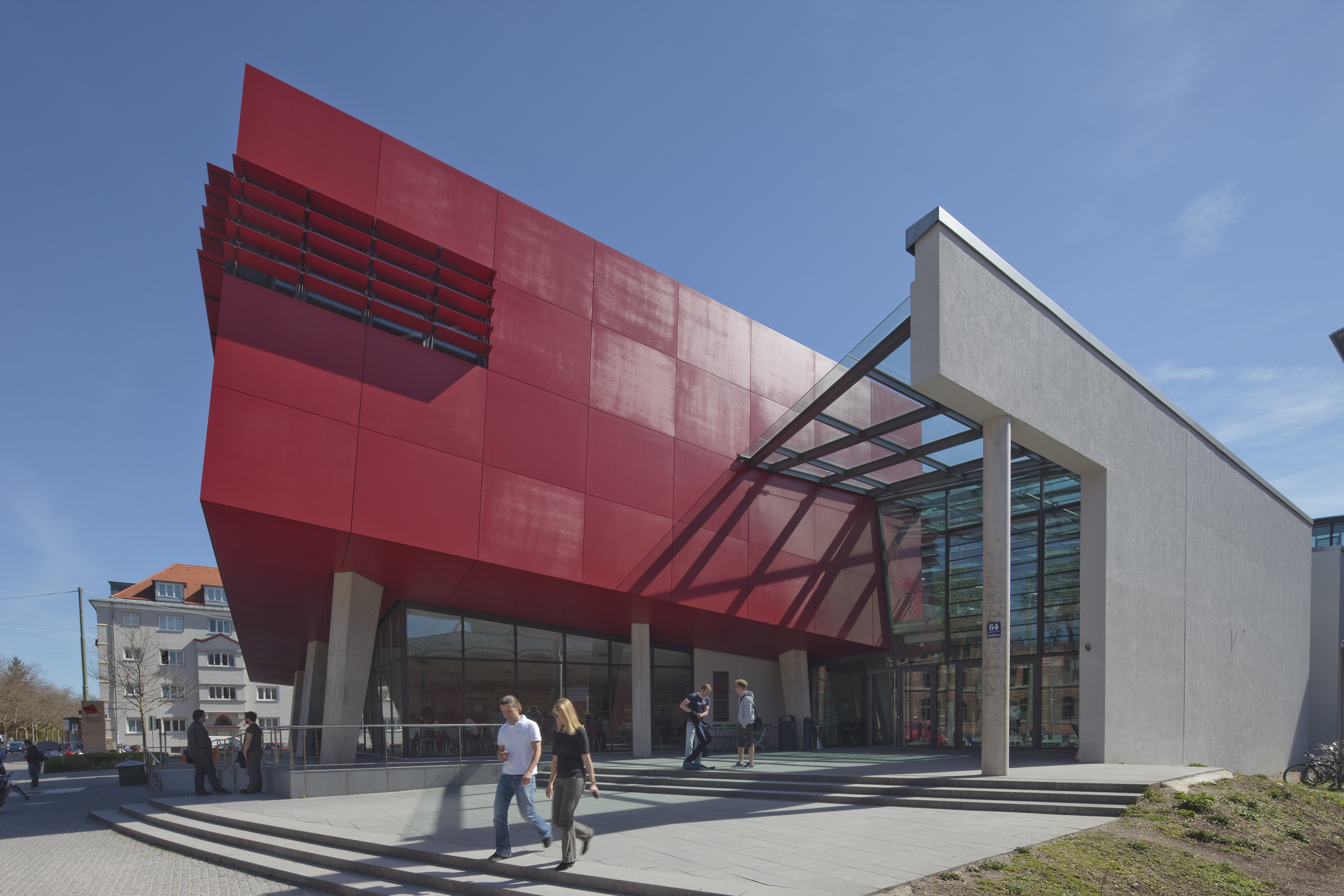
"Red Cube" in Lothstr. 64

The oldest of the founding institutions of the Munich University of Applied Sciences was the Staatsbauschule München. Its predecessor institution, the Königliche Baugewerkschule in Munich, emerged from Hermann Mitterer's building trade lessons at the Munich holiday school from 1821. After its formal spin-off in April 1823 under Gustav Vorherr, it was the first training centre for building tradesmen in the German-speaking world. In contrast to the École polytechnique in Paris and the Berlin Bauakademie, which already existed at this time, a modern building trade was taught here that was primarily orientated towards local requirements and also included the previously neglected rural areas.

In the wake of the November Revolution, the name changed in 1918 to Staatliche Bauschule München, later Staatsbauschule. This was not associated with a structural change. Even before the Nazis came to power, they massively attacked the management of the State Building School. In 1946, Max Stiehle, who had been persecuted by the Nazis, was appointed director of the State Building School.

The Higher Technical College of the City of Munich dates back to 1924. It came under the management of the National Socialist Gebhard Himmler in 1935. Disagreeable lecturers were sometimes formally dismissed or forced out, and there were also arrests. By the end of the war, many of the buildings of the predecessor institutes had been destroyed. Known as the ‘Engineering School of the Capital of the Movement’ during the National Socialist era, it was renamed the Oskar von Miller Polytechnic in 1946.

In 1956, the Bavarian state school inspectorate authorised a private technical school under the direction of Horst-Dietrich Bohne. From 1958, it was a higher technical college, where electronic computing was already included in the curriculum. It specialised in aircraft construction, automotive engineering and industrial engineering. The latter described the field of activity of industrial engineers. In 1967, the Higher Technical College was renamed the Bohne School of Engineering when it was taken over by a school association. The members of the Bohne Engineering School's flight technology group had aeroplanes at their disposal for flight instruction in Fürstenfeldbruck and Bad Tölz.

HM's predecessor institutions also included the Higher Technical School for Youth and Social Work (founded in 1919), the Department of Commercial Graphics at the Academy for the Graphic Arts (founded in 1907/1927), the Higher Technical School for Youth Leaders (founded in 1936) and the Higher Business School in Munich (founded in 1962).

=== Fachhochschule München ===
The Munich University of Applied Sciences was founded on 1 August 1971 as a result of the newly introduced University of Applied Sciences Act as the successor to these engineering schools and some higher technical colleges. As was customary at the time, the existing training facilities were utilised:

- the municipal Oskar-von-Miller Polytechnic
- the Munich State Construction School, Academy for Construction Technology
- the Munich Higher Business School
- the Bohne Engineering School
- the Higher Technical College for Youth and Social Work
- the Higher Technical College for Social Pedagogy
- the Department of Commercial Graphics at the Academy of Graphic Arts

were merged into one Fachhochschule.

In 2003, the photography programme of the State Academy of Photographic Design in Munich was incorporated into the Faculty of Design and in 2004 the academy was finally dissolved. Since 2007, the Munich University of Applied Sciences has been renamed several times:

In October 2007, it became the ‘Hochschule für angewandte Wissenschaften - FH München’, or ‘Munich University of Applied Sciences’ or ‘HM’ for short. In 2011, the addition ‘Fachhochschule’ was cancelled and ‘Hochschule für angewandte Wissenschaften München’ was adopted as the name, although the legal status as a University of Applied Sciences was retained.

== Organisation ==
HM is organised into the following faculties:

- Architecture
- Civil Engineering
- Mechanical, Automotive and Aeronautical Engineering
- Electrical Engineering and Information Technology
- Building Services Engineering, Paper and Packaging Technology and Print and Media Technology
- Applied Sciences and Mechatronics
- Computer Science and Mathematics
- Geoinformatics
- Engineering and Management
- Business Administration
- Applied Social Sciences
- Design
- General and Interdisciplinary Studies
- Tourism

Faculty 13 is a special feature of the Munich University of Applied Sciences: it offers general science electives, of which all students have to take a certain number during the course of their studies, and has only two degree programmes of its own (B.A. International Project Management and M.A. Intercultural Communication and Cooperation).

== University ranking ==
In a joint ranking by Wirtschaftswoche and Universum in 2020, Munich University of Applied Sciences was ranked first three times, second twice and third once in six subjects for which the universities of applied sciences were assessed, making it the best of all German universities of applied sciences.

In the international university ranking U-Multirank, the Munich University of Applied Sciences achieved the top score six times in 2021. Since July 2011, the Munich University of Applied Sciences has been one of the top three EXIST start-up universities in Germany and thus has access to millions in funding to support student start-ups. Start-up support is provided jointly with the affiliated institute ‘Strascheg Center for Entrepreneurship’.

The Munich University of Applied Sciences and its Strascheg Centre for Entrepreneurship (SCE) regularly occupy top positions in the Gründungsradar study. The ranking shows at which universities start-up support is particularly well established. In the ‘large universities’ category (over 15,000 students), HM achieved first place in 2012, 2016 and 2022. In 2022, it had the highest score across all categories (large, medium-sized and smaller universities).

== Campuses ==
The university has three campuses: Campus Lothstraße, Campus Pasing and Campus Karlstraße. Campus Lothstraße also includes the buildings of the Department of Design in Infanteriestraße and the Department of Tourism in Schachenmeierstraße.

=== Campus Lothstraße ===
- approx. 11,800 students
- Administration
- Center for continuing education
- Department of Mechanical, Automotive and Aeronautical Engineering
- Department of Electrical Engineering and Information Technology
- Department of Building Services Engineering, Paper and Packaging Technology and Print and Media Technology
- Department of Applied Sciences and Mechatronics
- Department of Computer Science and Mathematics
- Department of Business Administration
- Department of Design (Infanteriestraße)
- Department of General and Interdisciplinary Studies
- Department of Tourism (Schachenmeierstraße 35 48.091390°N 11.323690°E)

=== Campus Pasing ===
- approx. 4,200 students
- Department of Business Administration
- Department of Applied Social Sciences

=== Campus Karlstraße ===
- approx. 1,900 students
- Department of Architecture
- Department of Civil Engineering
- Department of Geoinformatics

== See also ==
- Education in Germany
- List of universities in Germany
