= Am Hart =

Sub-district of the Munich city district 11

Coordinates: 48°11′47″N 11°34′30″E

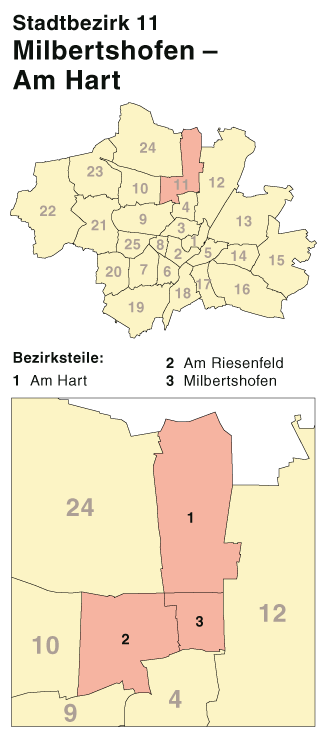
Am Hart; Here number 1

Am Hart (Central Bavarian: Am Hoart) is the northernmost of the three sub-districts of the Munich city district 11 Milbertshofen-Am Hart.

== Location ==
The district of Am Hart extends north of the Munich North Ring, between Ingolstädter Straße in the east and Schleissheimer Straße in the west, up to the northern edge of the city at the A99. It therefore borders Oberschleissheim in the North, Schwabing-Freimann in the East, Milbertshofen in the South and Feldmoching-Hasenbergl in the West.

== Description ==
In the year 2015, Am Hart had 29,029 inhabitants, with a population density of 4,199.8 inhabitants/km^{2}. On the south-western part of the still existing open-air area known as the Panzerwiese, the Nordhaide settlement exists since the 1990s and is home to several thousand inhabitants. To the north is the Hartelholz forest area. Also a number of former worker's settlements still exist from the time between the world wars. These include the settlements Harthof, Am Hart, Kaltherberge and Neuherberge. Across from the BMW Research and Innovation Center (Forschungs- und Innovationszentrum, FIZ), Knorrstraße corner Troppauer Straße, a sculpture exists in reminiscent of the so-called Judensiedlung (Jewish Quarter) Milbertshofen. To the south is the Euro industrial park. The Bundeswehr medical academy is located on the Neuherbergstrasse, in the Ernst-von-Bergmann-Kaserne. Sudetendeutschen Straße 40 is home to the "Wirtshaus am Hart" with its beer garden and the small performance stage. Knorrstraße 139 is the location of the Bayerisches Landesamt für Verfassungsschutz. In 2008 the Dominikuszentrum, 2009 the Mira shopping center, 2012 the Cultural Center 2411, 2015 the School Center Nordhaide, and in 2016 the Gymnasium München Nord were opened. To the north and south of Weyprechtstraße is the Harthofanger green area. Subway stations in the district are the U2 Harthof as well as the U2 Am Hart.

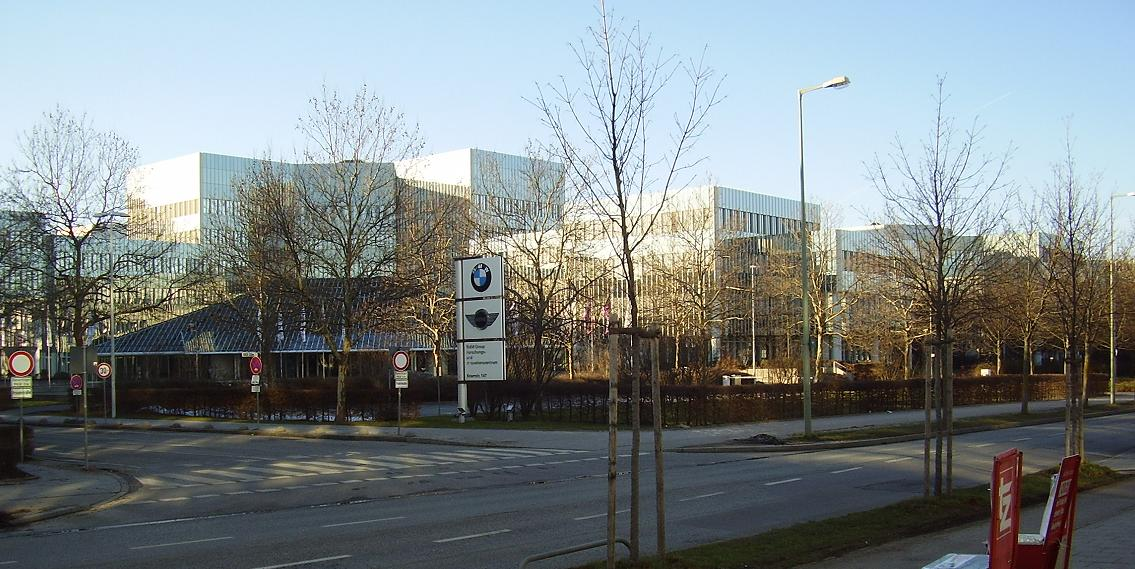
BMW Research and Innovation center

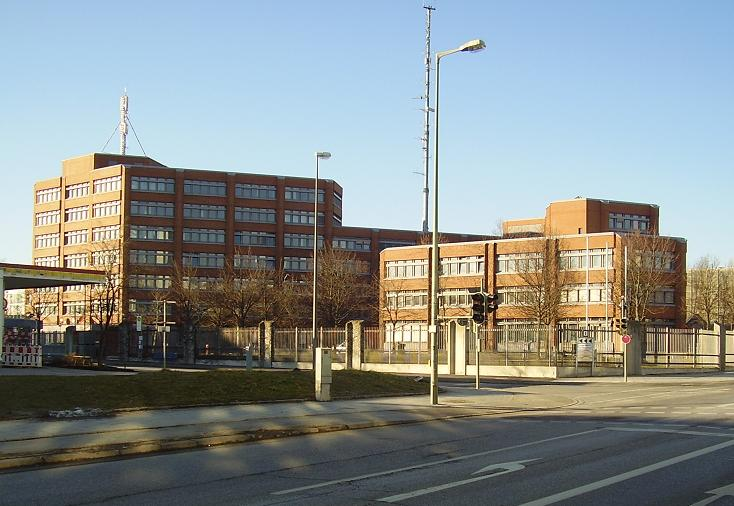
Bayerisches Landesamt für Verfassungsschutz

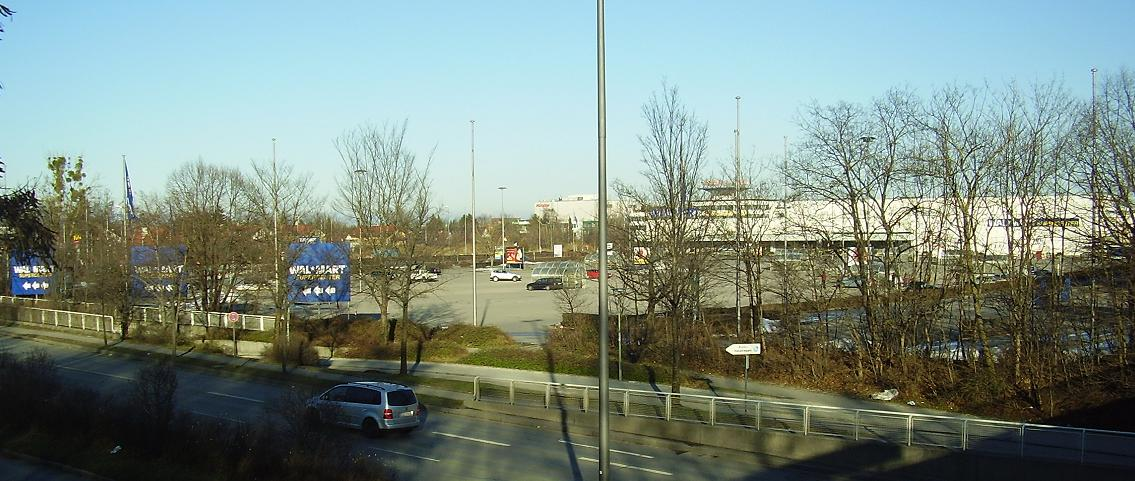
Euro industrial park

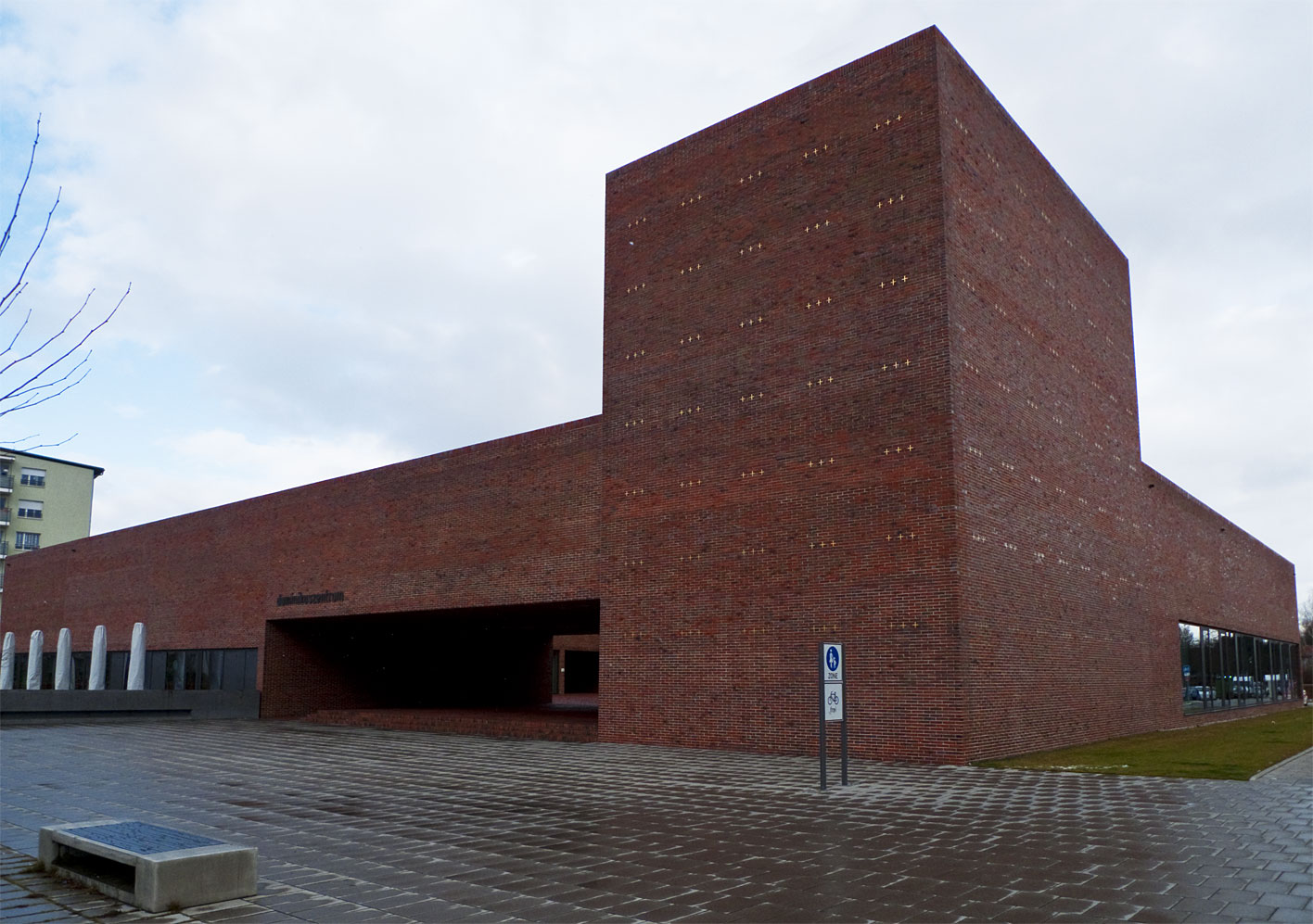
Dominican Center

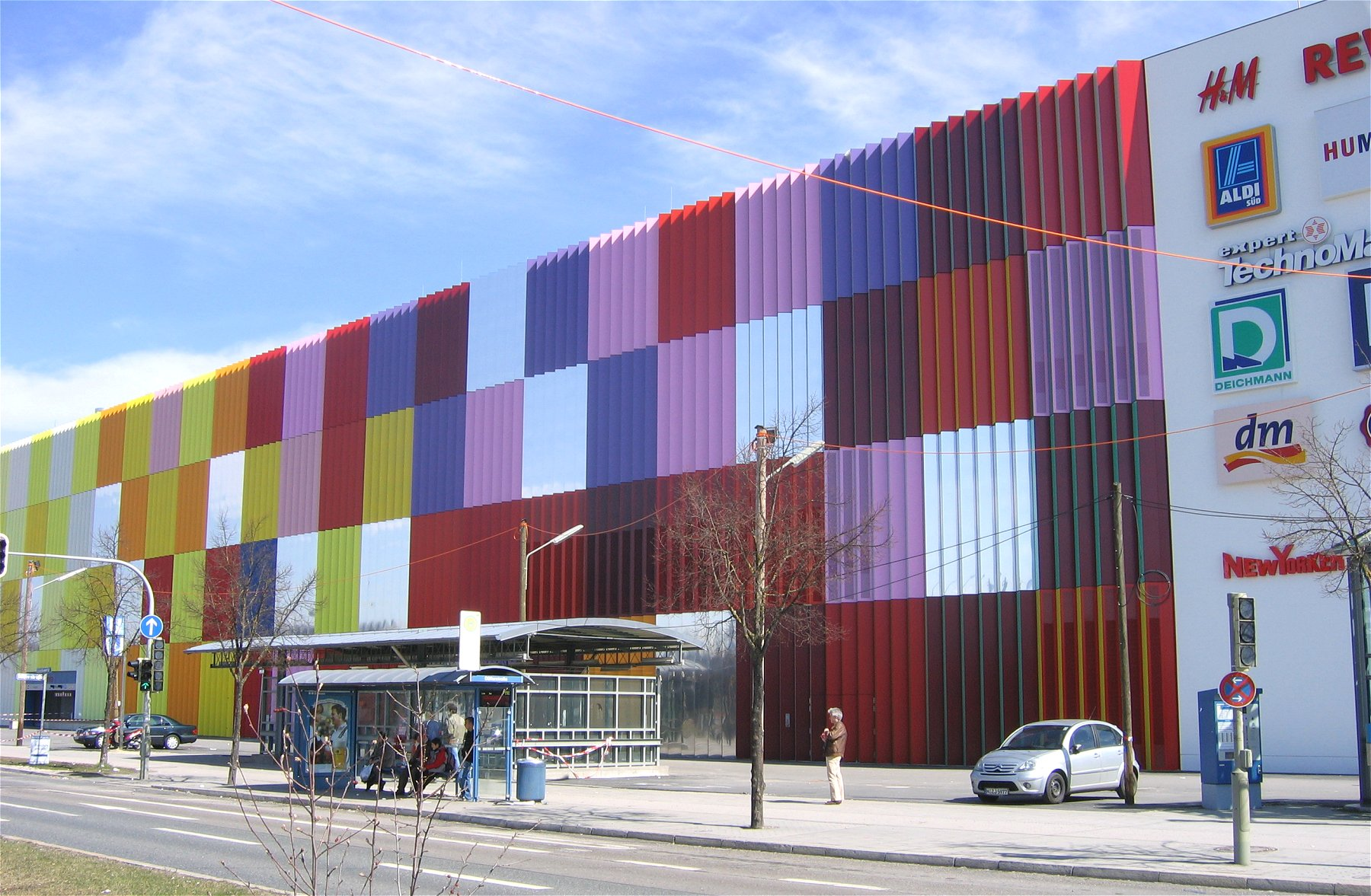
Mira

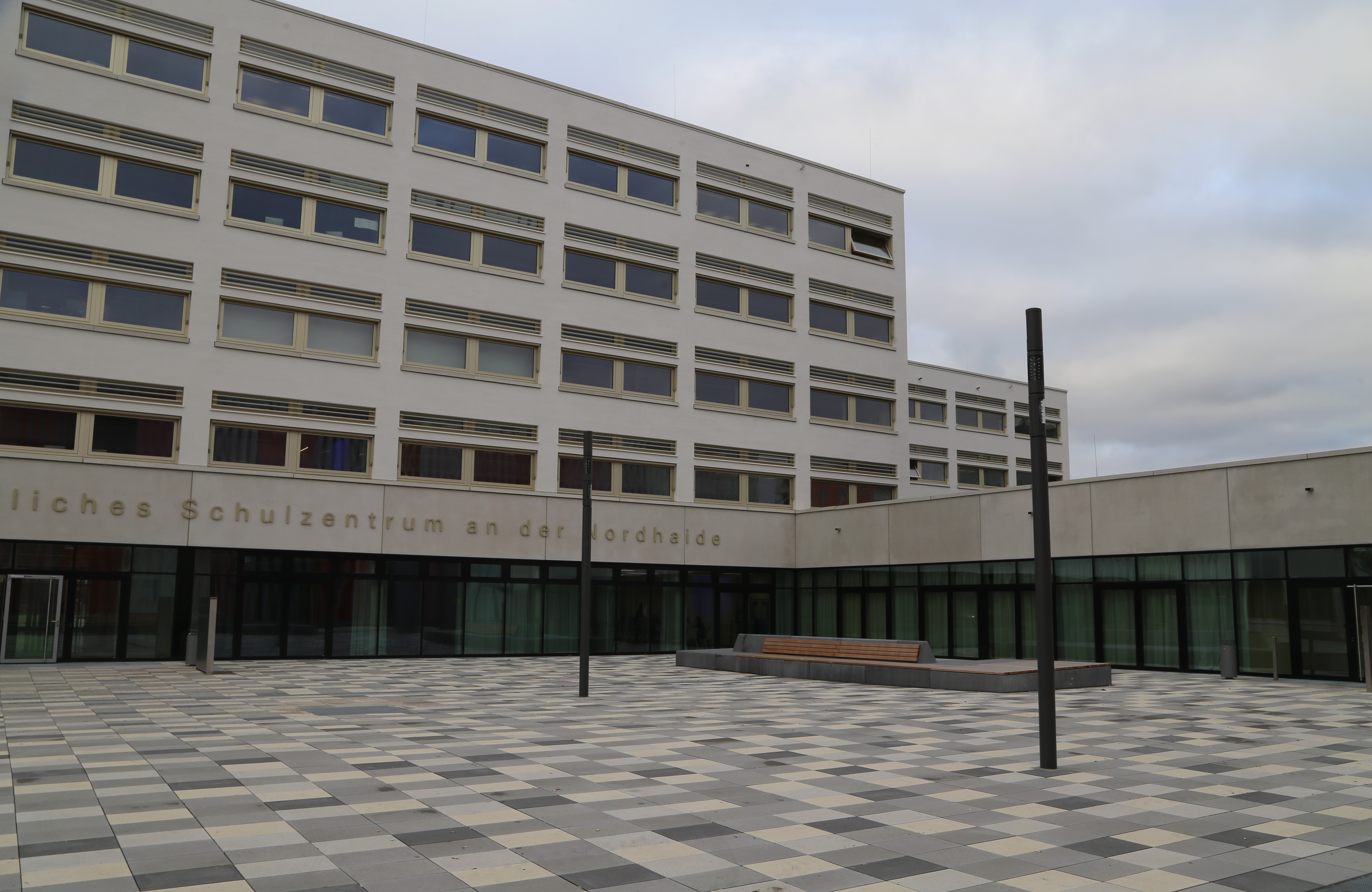
School Center Nordhaide

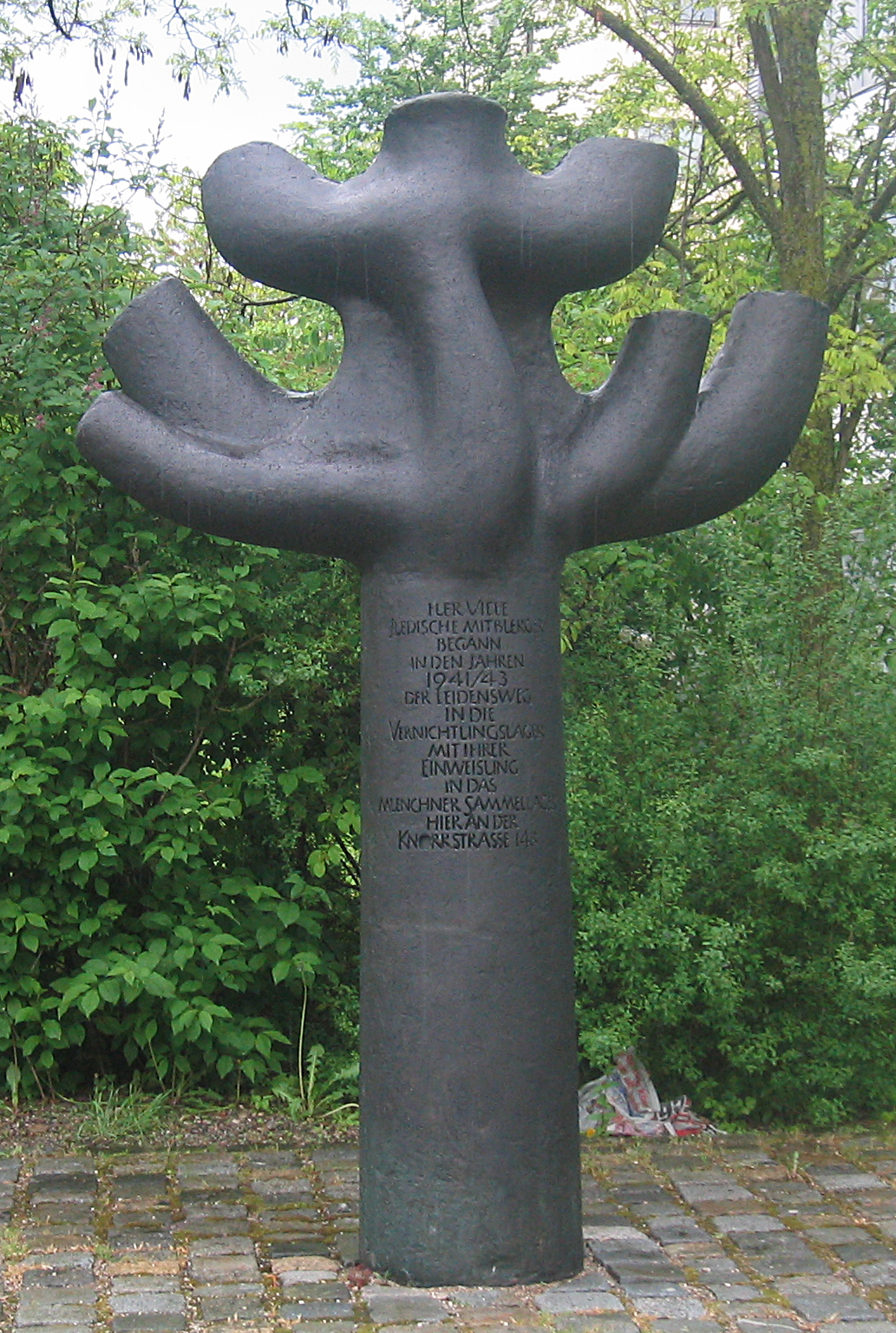
Memorial to the Milbertshofen Jewish camp

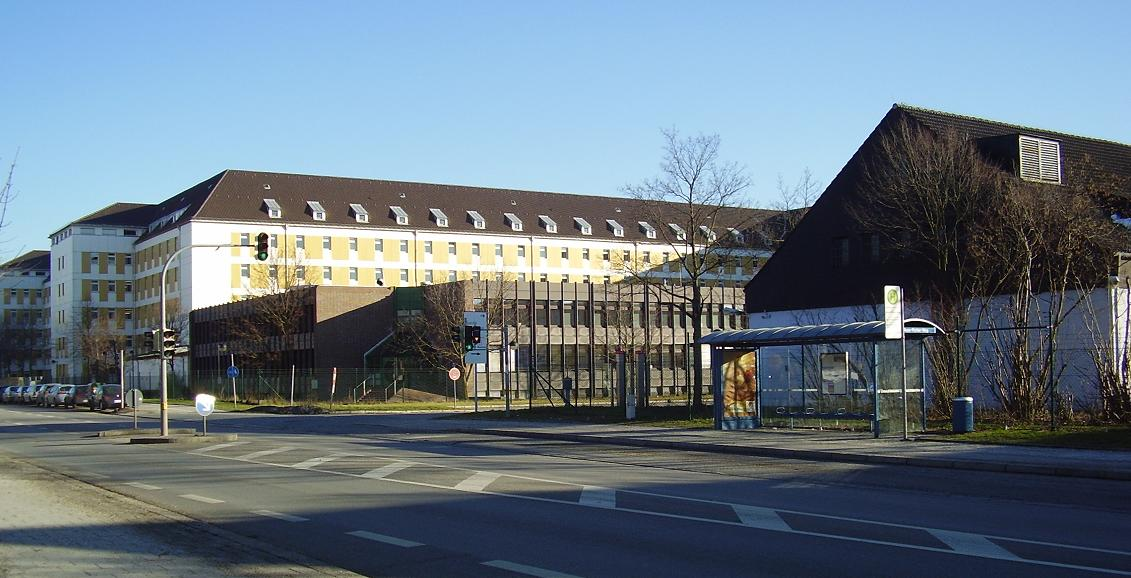
Ernst-von-Bergmann-Kaserne

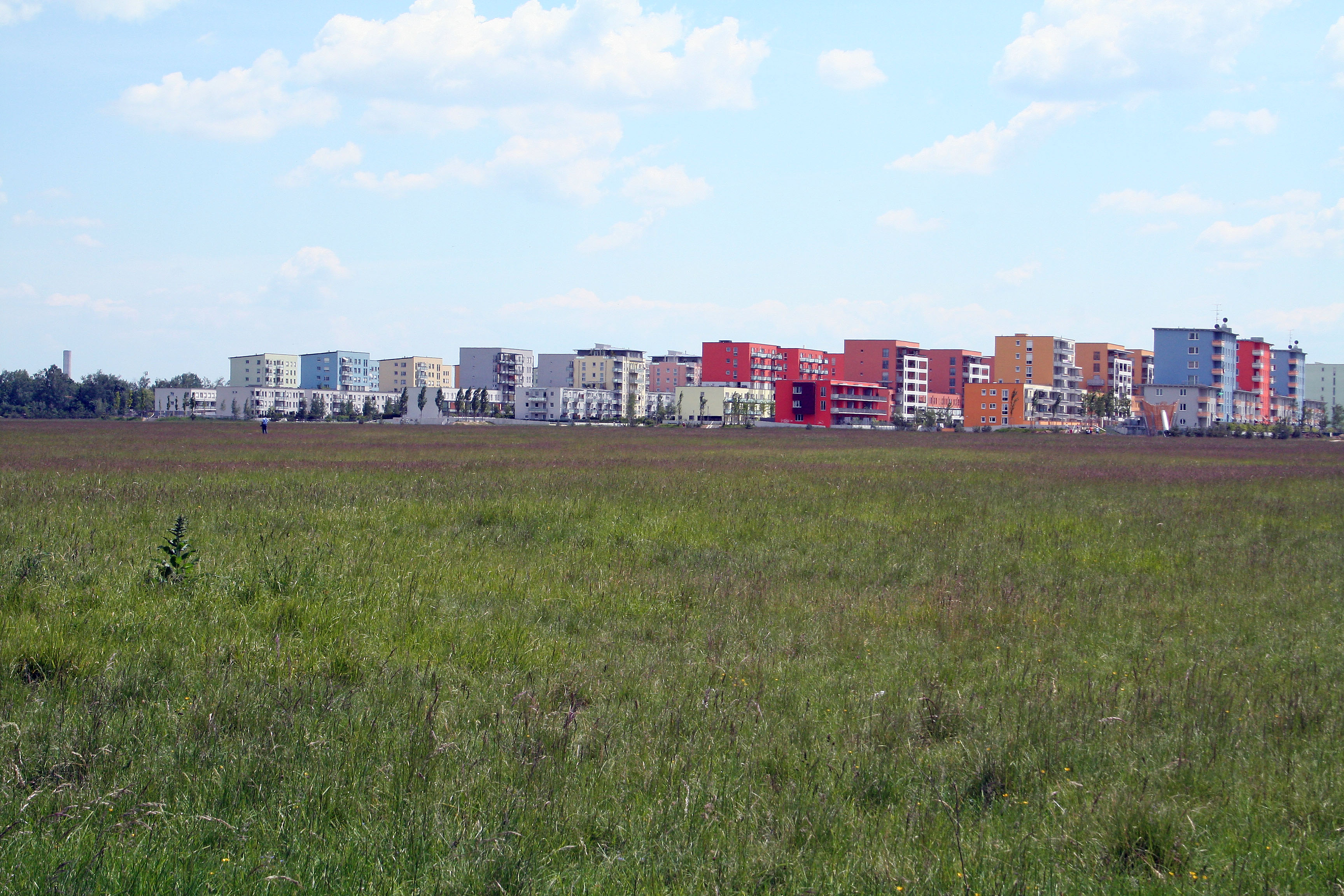
Nordhaide

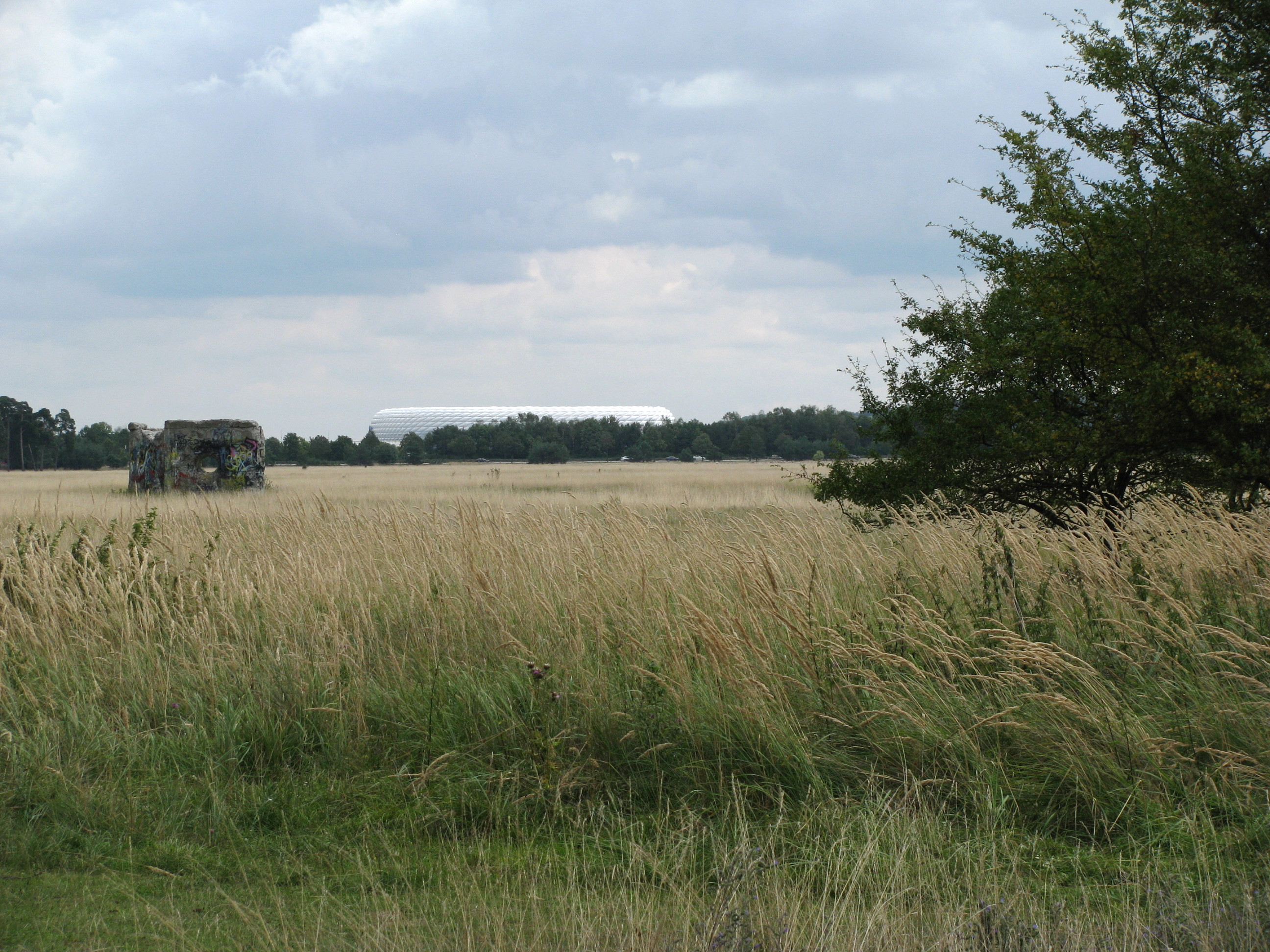
Panzerwiese

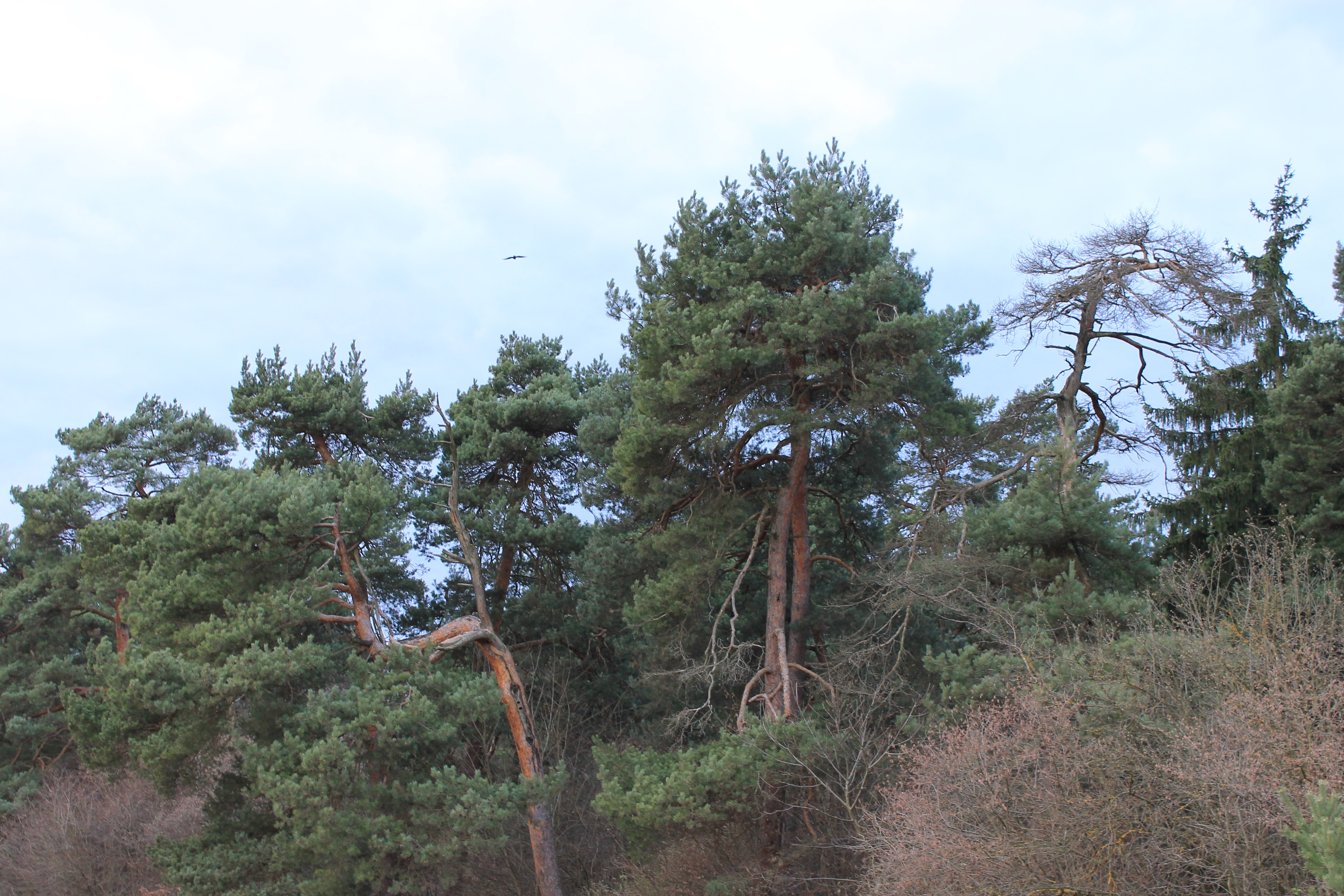
Hartelholz

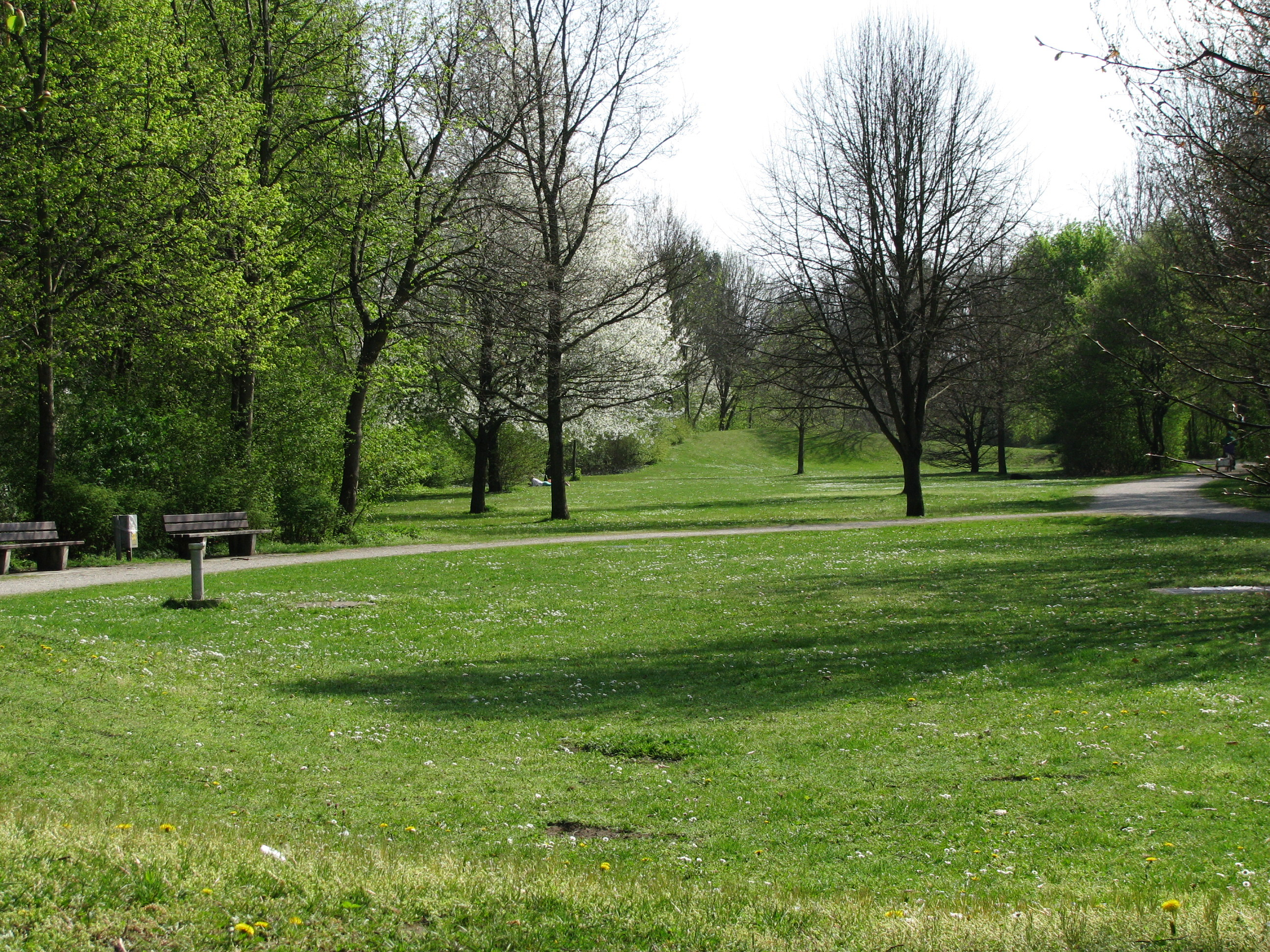
Harthofanger

== History ==
The Northern part of the district (north of the Munich North Ring) used to belong to the municipality of Feldmoching; Only Kaltherberge and adjacent areas on today's Ingolstädter Straße were parts of the Milbertshofen municipality. The original name should come from Reinhartingen. On the Schleissheimer Straße, in the 19th Century, some colonists settled there. The Bavarian Army's ammunition depot known as Pulverturm, is also said to exists there since 1838. The district is named after the so-called "Reichskleinsiedlung" Am Hart, which was built by the National Socialists from 1933 onwards. A decision by the town council on the 10 October 1933, foresaw the construction of a Reichskleinsiedlung next to Ingolstädter Strasse, which was to receive the official name "Am Hart". The settlement was opened on 8 September 1936. Approximately 340 nearly identical single-family homes for workers were created around the area on Ingolstädter Straße. After the Second World War the additional "Reichskleinsiedlung" was canceled. Until the end of the 1980s, the Panzerwiese was used by the military. Since 2003, more than 2,500 new apartments have been built in the Nordhaide. With the Dominikuszentrum, the Mira shopping center, the cultural center 2411 and the school center Nordhaide the appropriate infrastructure was created.
