= Die Freiheit =

Freiheit is a German term, translating to freedom or liberty. As a name, Die Freiheit can stand for:

- Freedom – Civil Rights Party for More Freedom and Democracy (Die Freiheit – Bürgerrechtspartei für mehr Freiheit und Demokratie), a German minor political party, based in Berlin and founded in 2010
- Freiheit, a 19th-century anarchist journal, founded in 1879, and published by German and Austrian emigrants in London until its cessation in 1910
- Die Freiheit, a German socialist daily newspaper, published in Berlin from 1918 to 1922.
