= Politically Incorrect (blog) =

German-language political blog

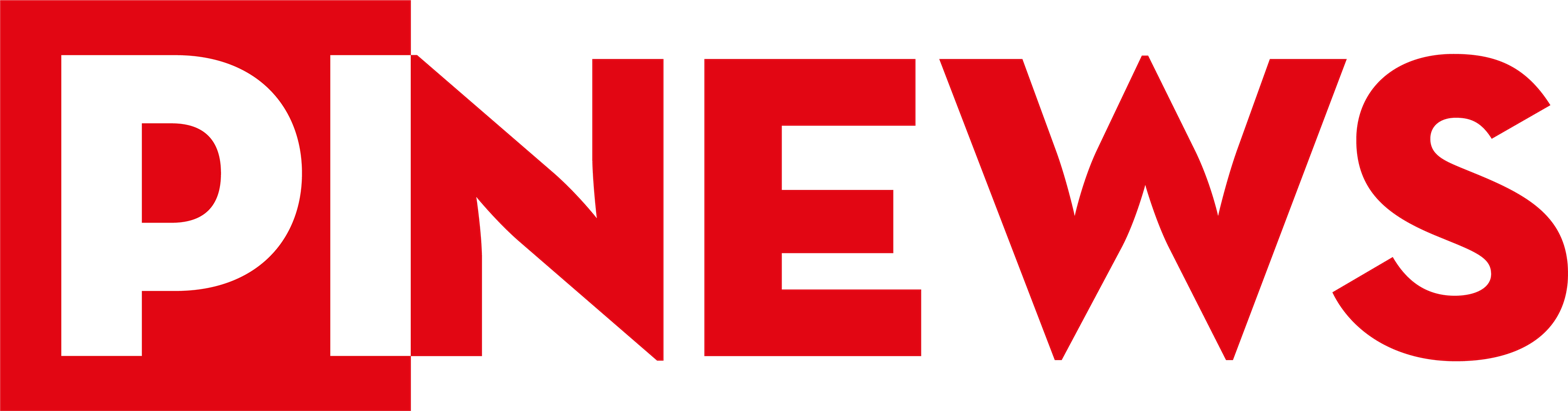
- Website type: Political blog
- Available in: German and English
- Owner: Unknown
- Creator: Stefan Herre
- Website: www.pi-news.net (German)
- Commercial: No
- Launched: November 11, 2004
- Current status: Online

Politically Incorrect (commonly abbreviated PI) is a mainly German-language counter-jihad political blog which focuses on topics related to immigration, multiculturalism, and Islam in Germany and Western societies. A condensed version of the weblog is available in English. The blog is one of Germany's oldest far-right sites. Much of its content is Islamophobic.

PI's self-declared goal is to bring news to a wider public attention which it perceives to be ignored or suppressed in what PI declared as "the mainstream media" due to a pervading "leftist political correctness". The site has no imprint or legal details; the editors and authors are disguised.

According to Der Spiegel, as of April 2021, the Federal Office for the Protection of the Constitution (Verfassungsschutz) classifies PI as "verified as extremistic" („erwiesen extremistisch") and surveils PI-affiliated activists. The blog's local news bureau in Bavaria has been investigated by the Bavarian Office for the Protection of the Constitution.

== History ==
Politically Incorrect was founded in 2004, soon after the re-election of George W. Bush, by a German teacher named Stefan Herre "to do something against Anti-Americanism"; its popularity surged in the wake of the Muhammad cartoons controversy the following year. Herre participated in a 2007 international counter-jihad conference in Brussels, and has been on the board of advisors of Stop Islamization of Nations (SION). It is one of the most successful German blogs, receiving several tens of thousand visitors each day and ranking among the thousand biggest German websites in terms of traffic. The site ranked ninth in March 2013 among German blogs in terms of public resonance in virtual social networks. The blog is interactive, allowing visitors to leave comments within a certain time limit.

== Reception ==
The blog has been widely criticized by German media for inciting Islamophobia and equating Islam as a whole with Islamic extremism. The blog's internet shop sells items with the slogan "Islamophobic and proud of it". Herre says his Islamophobia is without shame: "Phobia is fear, and I'm afraid of Islam."

The SPD politician Sebastian Edathy, a spokesman for the party on interior affairs, views Politically Incorrect as a vehicle of right-wing populist agitation. It is not observed, however, by the German Federal Office for the Protection of the Constitution which sees it as differing from right-wing extremism in its support of a democratic order and basic rights, as well as its pro-Israel stance. Even so, the Munich local group which cooperates with the German Freedom Party is monitored by the Bavarian branch of the office since April 2013.

== See also ==
- Michael Stürzenberger
