= Alabama-Halle =

Former concert and theatre venue in Munich, Germany

Coordinates: 48°11′42″N 11°34′05″E

Alabama-Halle (Alabama Hall) was a concert and theatre venue in Munich, Germany, which was also used to broadcast the television programme Live aus dem Alabama. It was originally part of a military depot.

The location, in the north of the city near the site of the 1972 Summer Olympics (until 1913 in Milbertshofen), was a bicycle racing track from 1906 to 1914 and then a military depot from 1917 to 1974, initially for the Bavarian Army. In 1935 a large three-sectioned storage building and an ammunition depot were constructed there for the Wehrmacht, and after World War II were requisitioned by the U.S. military along with the other military properties in Munich, each of which they named after a U.S. state. This location became the Alabama Storage Area, and was initially used as storage for care packages, then underwear and socks. In 1963 the Bundeswehr acquired part of the site and built a barracks there. In 1978 BMW exercised an option to buy the remainder of the site to house research operations at a future date, and starting in 1981 the company made the main building, the Alabama-Halle, available for events of the Munich Theatre Festival, which they supported through Spielmotor, an arts-sponsorship partnership with the City of Munich. The Alabama-Halle became so popular that it was copied in other cities in Germany. The venue hosted concerts from 1981 to 1988. Artists that performed at the venue include King Crimson, Golden Earring, Dio, Level 42, R.E.M., Big Country, Bon Jovi, Blue Öyster Cult, The Pogues, 10,000 Maniacs, Tina Turner, Dead Kennedys and also performances of Philip Glass' music and theatre including Mauricio Kagel, the Royal Shakespeare Company (performing Edward Bond's Lear), the Teatr Wielki of Warsaw and the Merce Cunningham Dance Company.

Bayerisches Fernsehen, an arm of Bayerischer Rundfunk, televised concerts from the Alabama-Halle under the titles Rock aus dem Alabama (Rock from the Alabama) and Münchner Rocktage (Munich Rock Days), then beginning on 2 January 1984, the weekly discussion and concert programme for teenagers Live aus dem Alabama (Live from the Alabama), which became famous nationwide. The programme moved to other venues and changed its title accordingly after BMW closed the Alabama-Halle in 1988.

BMW closed the buildings in 1988, and the location is now home to their main research facilities and the Gymnasium München Nord. Several of the buildings were burnt down in 1991 for an emergency response exercise simulating an air crash in an urban area. The name Alabamahalle is now used by a nightclub in Freimann, near Schwabing.
