= Michael Stürzenberger =

German activist

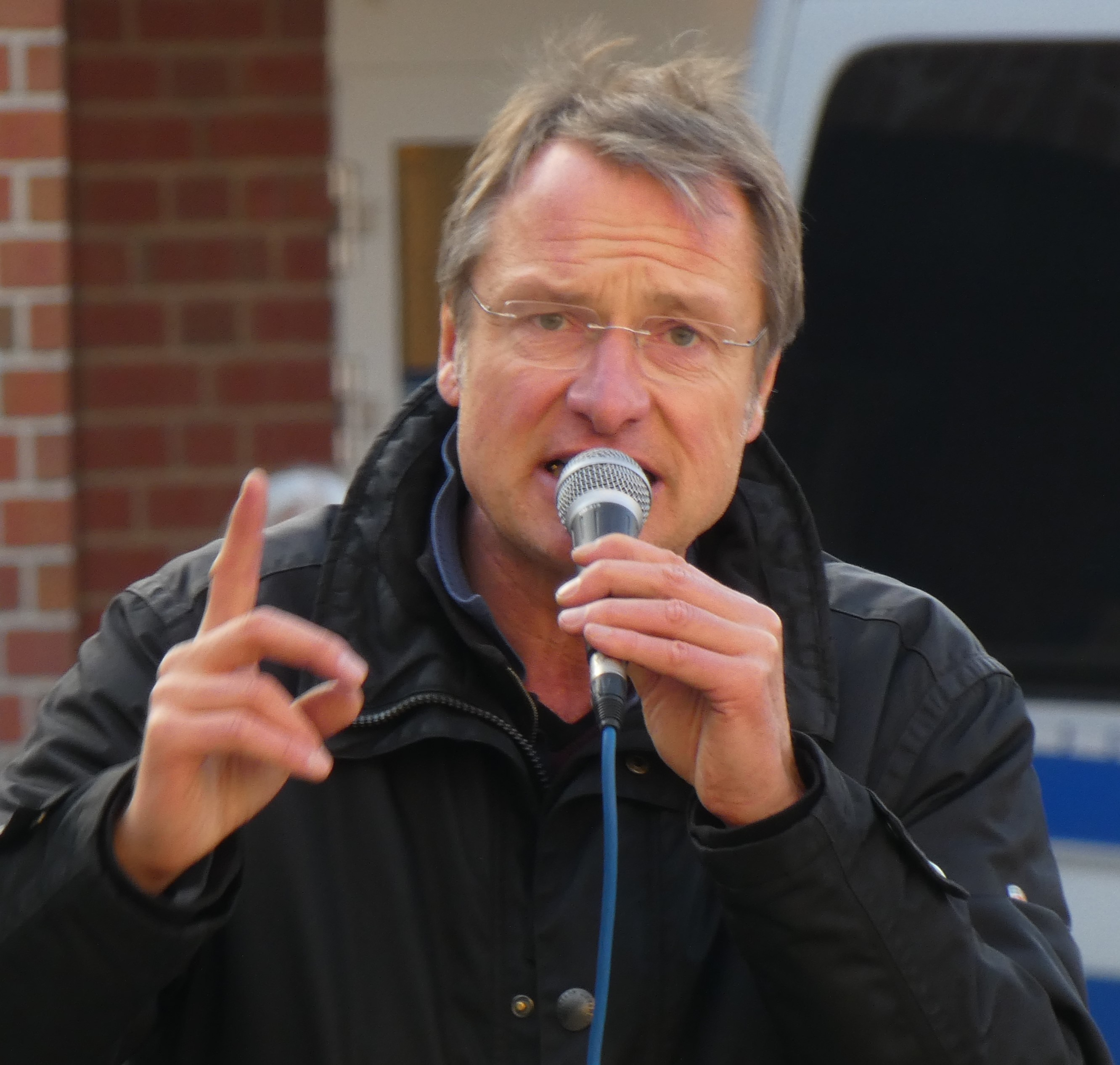
- Stürzenberger in 2018

Leader of the German Freedom Party
- In office 2013–2016
- Preceded by: René Stadtkewitz
- Succeeded by: Office dissolved

Personal details
- Born: 28 September 1964 (age 61) Bad Kissingen, West Germany
- Party: Christian Social Union in Bavaria (2003–2011); German Freedom Party (2011–2016)
- Occupation: Activist; public speaker; blogger; journalist

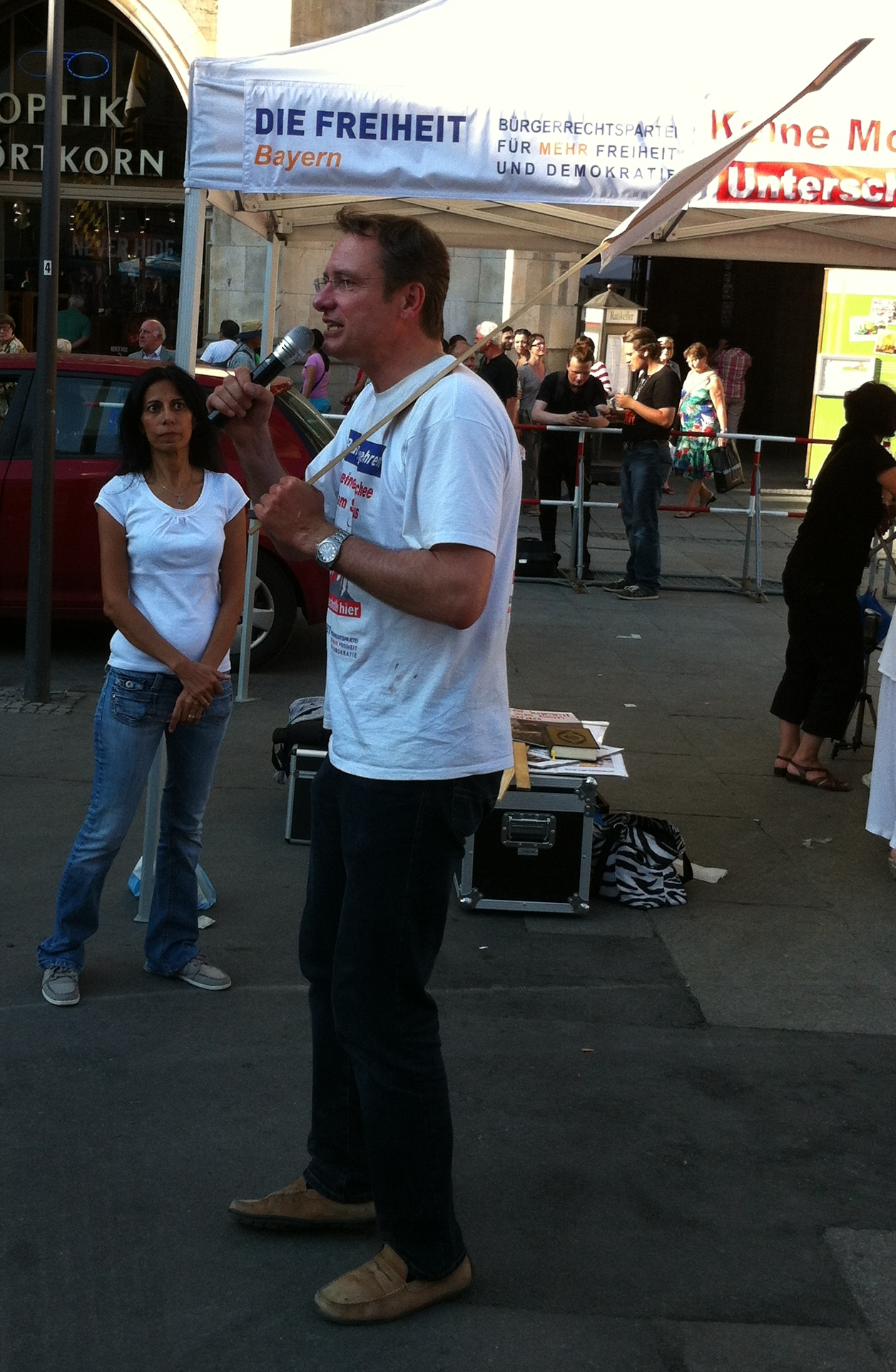
Stürzenberger during a signature collection for the German Freedom Party in 2013

Michael Stürzenberger (born 28 September 1964) is a German counter-jihad activist, blogger and critic of Islam. He was the leader of the German Freedom Party from 2013 to 2016, and has been active for many years with his public speaking and protests against Islam with groups such as the Citizens' Movement Pax Europa and Pegida. He has been convicted of several criminal offences related to his political activism, including incitement to hatred. He is an active YouTuber and contributor to the blog Politically Incorrect, and was observed by the Bavarian Office for the Protection of the Constitution for "anti-constitutional extremism" from 2013 until 2022.

He was the primary target of an Islamist terrorist stabbing attack in Mannheim on 31 May 2024. He and five others were stabbed by the attacker, including a police officer who was stabbed in the neck from behind and later died of his injuries. Stürzenberger survived.

== Background ==
Stürzenberger was born in Bad Kissingen, and studied political science and history at LMU Munich, but did not complete his studies and subsequently worked as a sports reporter for Bayern Journal, which was aired on the television channels RTL and Sat.1. According to the Süddeutsche Zeitung, Stürzenberger is a freelance television journalist by profession.

== Political activities ==
Stürzenberger joined the Christian Social Union in Bavaria (CSU) in 2003, and served as its press spokesman in Munich under Monika Hohlmeier until 2004.

He has cited the death of his colleague Ralph Burkei in the 2008 Mumbai attacks, during which they were in contact via SMS, as an important event for his anti-Islam beliefs, while stating that he had read the Quran after the September 11 attacks. He began contributing to the counter-jihad blog Politically Incorrect under the pseudonym byzanz, and was a member of the CSU until 2011, when he left the party and joined the German Freedom Party. He was elected to the federal executive board of the German Freedom Party, but due to his radical Islamophobic attitude, his election led to the resignation of several state executives and many members. He had previously been relieved of his positions in the party after a blog post that called for Muslims to be forced to leave the country unless they renounced their faith. In 2012, he spoke at international counter-jihad rallies in Aarhus, Denmark, and in Stockholm, Sweden.

Stürzenberger was elected leader of the German Freedom Party after René Stadtkewitz resigned in 2013, and held the position until 2016 when the party was dissolved in favour of the Alternative for Germany (AfD). He ran for local elections in Munich-Bogenhausen in 2013, receiving 0.4% of the vote. He thereafter ran for Lord Mayor elections in Munich in 2014, and would speak in the public square almost every day—he eventually received 0.5% of the vote.

== Protest activism ==
Stürzenberger has for many years held anti-Islam protests in the Munich city square. In his rallies he has railed against the presence of Islam in Germany, and in particular the plans of Imam Benjamin Idriz to build an Islamic centre in Munich. He has been active as the leader of the German branch of Stop Islamisation of Europe (SIOE), as an activist of the Citizens' Movement Pax Europa (BPE), and as a Pegida activist for the local Bagida. He was in 2015 described as "the face of the Munich branch of Pegida", while leading a protest of 1,500 people. As he in the past has spoken for up to eight hours a day, the city council has decided that he has to stop speaking for ten minutes each ten minutes.

In September 2014, Stürzenberger stated to have collected 60,000 signatures against the Islamic centre of Imam Benjamin Idriz, far more than the 34,000 that was necessary to initiate a referendum in Munich. The city council however rejected the signatures, claiming the citizens' request as inadmissible because the reasons used to collect signatures contained "a large number of incorrect factual claims and speculations". The city council also claimed the initiative was a violation of the freedom of belief guaranteed in the Basic Law, since it opposed any Muslim buildings, and adopted a resolution following the vote on the citizen's appeal entitled "Solidarity with Muslims in our city".

During his rallies, he faced physical attacks, including one incident on October 23, 2013, where his glasses were broken, and he sustained minor injuries from a 34-year-old Munich resident of Turkish origin. Another attack occurred in December 2022 in Bonn, where he and two BPE stewards were injured by punches from a 20-year-old trainee from Tannenbusch.

=== 2024 stabbing incident ===
On 31 May 2024, Stürzenberger and several other activists were stabbed in an attack during a public meeting of the Citizens' Movement Pax Europa (BPE) in Mannheim. The attacker was only stopped by being shot by the police. A police officer was critically injured and died two days after the stabbing. Stürzenberger was taken to undergo emergency surgery for non-life threatening injuries.

A 25-year-old Afghan refugee known as Sulaiman Ataee was named the primary suspect, and later convicted of the crime. Ataee told investigators that his goal was to kill critics of Islam and "supposed infidels".

== Convictions and acquittals ==
In May 2013, Stürzenberger was acquitted for the charge of having shown a poster with an image and quote of Heinrich Himmler at a demonstration to prove the similarity between Nazism and Islam. He was sentenced to a fine of 800 euros in July 2013 for insulting a police officer by telling him to "Ach, leck mich doch am Arsch", and to 2,500 euros in 2014 for calling Islam a "cancer" on the Politically Incorrect blog, for which he was acquitted in 2017. He was sentenced to a four-month conditional prison sentence and 960 euros in 2015 for saying that all Muslims are potential terrorists at a Pegida rally, and to a suspended sentence of half a year in prison in November 2017 for sharing a photo on Facebook of a ranking Nazi shaking hands with the Grand Mufti of Jerusalem Amin al-Husseini. In December 2017 he was sentenced to a fine of 2,400 euros for incitement to hatred, after he spoke of an "invasion" from the Islamic world at a Pegida event in 2015.
