= Susanne Hirzel =

German resistance activist

Susanne Zeller (née Hirzel; 7 November 1921 – 4 December 2012) was a German resistance member who was part of the White Rose.

== Early life ==
Susanne Hirzel, daughter of Ulm pastor Ernst Hirzel and granddaughter of the geographer Robert Gradmann, was initially an enthusiastic member of the League of German Girls (where Sophie Scholl was her group leader), but distanced herself increasingly from those in power.

Hirzel became a student at the State Academy for Music in Stuttgart, where by spring 1942 her exceptional musical ability was being recognised.

== Hirzel and White Rose ==
In late 1942, while a music student, she again met Sophie Scholl, who called for resistance. At the end of January, at the request of her teenage brother Hans she distributed envelopes containing the fifth "White Rose" leaflet in mailboxes in Stuttgart. This secret operation was prepared together with Hans' classmate Franz Josef Müller in Ulm Martin Luther Church behind the organ. Her father Ernst Hirzel was then pastor at this parish.

After the arrest and execution of the Scholls, Susanne, her brother Hans, and Franz Josef Müller, were also arrested and convicted in the second "White Rose" trial (in which Kurt Huber, Willi Graf and Alexander Schmorell were sentenced by the People's Court under Roland Freisler to death). Hirzel was sentenced to six months' imprisonment because her knowledge of the leaflets could not be established.

== After the war ==
After the collapse of the Nazi dictatorship in 1945, she became a cello teacher. She wrote a number of books on cello technique.

After retiring she published her memories of life in Nazi Germany, in her book, From Yes to No. A Swabian Youth 1933–1945, published in 2000.

== Later political activities ==
Like her brother Hans, a functionary of the Republican party and their Presidential candidate, Susanne Hirzel was active in right-wing circles, particularly among the Republicans. In her memoirs A Swabian Youth she writes, inter alia, to the effect that 'The Allies had been "trying to eradicate as many Germans" in their air raids on German cities, and the German concentration camps were of the "model" that Stalin used and that the British followed in the Boer War'. Furthermore she gave interviews to Junge Freiheit in 2002, and to the blog Politically Incorrect in 2010.

She lived in Stuttgart in her latest years, and became actively involved in the counter-jihad organisation Citizens' Movement Pax Europa (BPE) against the "Islamisation" of Germany, seeing parallels between the subversion of democracy by the Nazis and the aims of the Jihad.
