= Ralph Burkei =

German television producer (1956–2008)

Ralph Burkei (15 December 1956, Munich – 26 November 2008) was a German television producer and co-owner of the Bavarian production company C.A.M.P. TV. He was also active in Bavarian local politics with the Munich CSU party and was its treasurer from 2000 to 2004. At one time, he was vice-president of the TSV 1860 München and president of the VfB Leipzig football teams.

Burkei died on the way to hospital after fleeing armed attackers and falling from the facade of the Taj Mahal hotel during the 2008 Mumbai attacks.

German counter-jihad activist Michael Stürzenberger, himself victim of the 2024 Mannheim stabbing, has cited that the death of his colleague Ralph Burkei in the 2008 Mumbai attack events, during which they were in contact via SMS, as an important event for his anti-Islam beliefs.
