= Hans Hirzel =

German resistance fighter (1924–2006)

Hans Hirzel (30 October 1924 – 3 June 2006) was a German resistance fighter. He was a member of the Ulm high school graduate group around which the White Rose resistance group formed.

== Early life ==
Hans Hirzel, the son of the pastor Ernst Ulmer Hirzel, was born in Untersteinbach, Germany, on 30 October 1924. He was the younger brother of Susanne Hirzel, who was childhood friends with Sophie Scholl. His family moved to Ulm, where Hirzel's family quickly became best friends with the Scholl family. While Hirzel was closer in age to Sophie Scholl, he became good friends with Hans Scholl, who he greatly admired.

== Work in the White Rose ==
"Hans Hirzel liked to visit the Scholl house to listen to Robert talk about what was going on in the world and to be around Hans Scholl, whom he looked up to and admired. Quick to grasp the implications of what he heard, Hans Hirzel early felt the same rumblings of rebellion that had seized Hans Scholl. In his own way and own time, he came to the same conclusion: Something has got to be done."

— Excerpt from “A Noble Treason” by Richard F. Hanser

After hearing of the White Rose from Hans Scholl, Hirzel, with schoolmate Franz J. Müller and his sister Susanne, began a group based on the White Rose. This group would receive the leaflets of the White Rose, which they would then copy and distribute in Ulm and the surrounding areas.

In 1943, he was arrested by the Gestapo, but was initially released again. After his release, Hirzel went to Hans and warned him that the Gestapo had files on him and his sister Sophie. Hirzel suggested that Scholl escape before he was captured by the Gestapo, but Scholl did not flee, as there was no way to leave Munich without endangering his family.

Hirzel, along with his sister Susanne, were arrested again shortly after the Scholl siblings' capture on February 18, 1943. At his trial on 19 April 1943, Hirzel was sentenced to five years in prison. He was released when the Nazi Dictatorship fell in May 1945.

== Death and legacy ==
Hirzel died, after a long serious illness, in Wiesbaden in June 2006. His grave is located in Wiesbaden-Dotzheim in the forest cemetery there. His name is featured on the memorial to the White Rose members in Ulm.
