= Franz Josef Müller =

Member of the White Rose dissident group (1924–2015)

Franz Josef Müller in 2009

Franz Josef Müller (8 September 1924 – 31 March 2015) was a member of the World War II-era White Rose resistance group in the Third Reich. In 1986, he founded the Weiße Rose Stiftung (foundation of the White Rose).

== Biography ==
Müller was born in Ulm on 8 September 1924. He raised money to collect stamps and envelopes, including pamphlets addressed to the White Rose and was involved in spreading the letters. He usually met with classmate Hans Hirzel, son of the parish priest at that time, in the hidden organ chamber of the Martin-Luther-Church in Ulm. Along with Hans Hirzel and Hirzel's older sister, Susanne Hirzel, he addressed and stamped 1000 of the fifth pamphlet of the White Rose. Müller was drafted to the military in February 1943 in France.

In March 1943, he was arrested by the Gestapo. Another member of the White Rose revealed his name under torture. On 19 April 1943, in the Justizpalast (Palace of Justice, in Munich), the second court case of the People's Court against the White Rose under Roland Freisler, started. Müller was sentenced to five years in prison. The reason why he, Hans and Susanne Hirzel were not sentenced to death, unlike the other members of the White Rose, is unknown. Müller thought that Freisler's racism played an important role since all three of them were blond and blue-eyed. During the court proceedings, Freisler screamed, "You have a classic good look, how could you be against the Führer?" At the end of the war, Müller was set free.

Instead of emigrating to the United States in 1947 as intended, he was convinced by Ulm Lord Mayor Robert Scholl, whose children Hans and Sophie Scholl had been sentenced to death and executed, to stay in Germany. Franz Josef Müller studied law in Tübingen, Basel and in Freiburg im Breisgau. He founded the Weiße Rose Stiftung in 1986, together with members and relatives of the members of the White Rose sentenced to death, with the intention to keep their legacy. In 1970, he frequently spoke to school classes to tell about his life and the White Rose. He is featured at the Ulmer DenkStätte Weiße Rose remembrance and exhibition center in Ulm.

Franz Josef Müller was awarded the München Leuchtet (Munich shines) and the Yad Vashem medal, the latter awarded by Israel to acknowledge Müller's membership in the White Rose and for his resistance to the Nazi regime.

Müller died in Munich on 31 March 2015, at the age of 90.

== Literature ==
- Inge Scholl: Die weiße Rose. Fischer, Frankfurt am Main 1993, ISBN 3-596-11802-6
