= René Stadtkewitz =

German politician

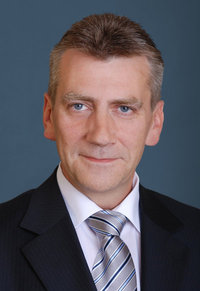
- Stadtkewitz in 2012

Mayor of Zehdenick
- Incumbent
- Assumed office 10 May 2026

Leader of the German Freedom Party
- In office 2010–2013
- Preceded by: Office created
- Succeeded by: Michael Stürzenberger

Member of the Abgeordnetenhaus of Berlin
- In office 2001–2011

Personal details
- Born: 9 January 1965 (age 61) East Berlin, East Germany
- Party: Alternative for Germany (2024–present)
- Other political affiliations: Christian Democratic Union (1995–2010); German Freedom Party (2010–2013)

René Stadtkewitz (born 9 January 1965) is a German political activist and politician. A former local Berlin state representative for the Christian Democratic Union (CDU) and anti-Islam activist, he co-founded the German Freedom Party in 2010, which he led until 2013. He has also been chairman of the Citizens' Movement Pax Europa.

On May 10, 2026, he was elected mayor of Zehdenick.

== Biography ==
=== Early life ===
Stadtkewitz was born in East Berlin. From 1981 to 1984, he completed vocational training as a metallurgist for rolling mill technology. From 1984 to 1986 he completed his basic military service. He states that he refused to work at the border and was therefore harassed by the Stasi. He has said that "I was done with the GDR when I was 21". From 1986 to 1991 Stadtkewitz worked in industrial robot construction. In the year the Wall fell, he fled with his family via Hungary from the GDR to the Federal Republic of Germany. After reunification he returned to Berlin.

=== Political career and arson attack ===
Stadtkewitz became a member of the Christian Democratic Union (CDU) in 1995, and represented the party locally in the state parliament of Berlin from 2001 to 2011. On the night of 10 August 2006, an arson attack was carried out on Stadtkewitz and his family in their house. A Molotov cocktail was thrown into an open basement window, setting a mattress on fire. Stadtkewitz and his wife got the two sleeping children out of their beds and fled outside. Stadtkewitz had been threatened a few months earlier. In three letters he was told that "the family would be at risk" if he did not give up his opposition to the construction of the Khadija Mosque and did not resign his mandate as a member of parliament. State security took up the investigation because a political background could not be ruled out. The CDU politicians Friedbert Pflüger and Frank Henkel and the state and parliamentary group leaders of the Berlin CDU declared their solidarity with Stadtkewitz. The perpetrators were not identified.

Stadtkewitz had campaigned against the construction of the Khadija Mosque of the Ahmadiyya Muslim Jamaat in Berlin-Heinersdorf. He supported a citizens' initiative and took part in several demonstrations against the construction of the mosque. At the closing rally of the demonstration on 11 July 2007, he gave a speech in which he described Islam as a "political religion" that "cannot be integrated into Europe".

=== German Freedom Party ===
Stadtkewitz was expelled from the CDU in 2010 after inviting Dutch anti-Islam politician Geert Wilders to hold a speech. He refused demands to cancel the invitation, while claiming that public debate about the Islamic faith had been "too timid" in Germany, and that the debate should focus on "the defense of freedom and of Christian values", including concerns about "countless young women, who are forced into arranged marriages, enslaved and who sometimes become victims of so-called honor killings". He then founded the German Freedom Party together with former CDU politician Marc Doll and former Pirate Party Germany politician Aaron Koenig. Later the same year, he was part of an initiative with international politicians Heinz-Christian Strache, Kent Ekeroth and Filip Dewinter in Jerusalem that declared their support for Israel against Islamic terrorism. He also attended an event at Ground Zero in New York City by the invitation of Pamela Geller and Stop Islamization of America, and an international counter-jihad conference in Paris.

Stadtkewitz stepped down as leader of the party in 2013, and instead called on his supporters to vote for the new Alternative for Germany (AfD), while Michael Stürzenberger became new leader. After comparing the parties' political programmes Stadtkewitz concluded that they overlapped 90 percent. After several hundred new members from the party joined AfD, the AfD's then-leader Bernd Lucke, considering the party "Islamophobic", however declared a ban on new admissions from the party.

=== Later activities ===
Stadtkewitz has later been active as chairman of the anti-Islamic activist organisation Citizens' Movement Pax Europa. In 2015, Stadtkewitz also held a speech at a Pegida rally where he intensified its thrust of criticism of Islam by characterising Islam as a politically totalitarian ideology.

Stadtkewitz eventually joined the AfD in 2024, became a member of the Zehdenick city council, and declared his candidacy for the mayoral election in Zehdenick in 2025. He reached the run-off to be held on 16 March after narrowly receiving the second most votes in the first round on 23 February with 38.5%. Stadtkewitz lost the run-off election with 37% of the vote, against Alexander Kretzschmar.

During the 2026 Mayoral Election in Zehdenick, Stadtkewitz received an absolute majority on the first round, making him the first directly-elected AfD mayor in Brandenburg. He received 58.4% of the votes.
