= Citizens' Movement Pax Europa =

German counter-jihad group

- Founded: 2008
- Purpose: Anti-Islam campaigning
- Headquarters: Menden, Deutschland
- Key people: René Stadtkewitz; Michael Stürzenberger; Elisabeth Sabaditsch-Wolff; Susanne Hirzel
- Website: paxeuropa-bpe.de

The Citizens' Movement Pax Europa (German: Bürgerbewegung Pax Europa, BPE) is a German anti-Islam, counter-jihad organisation. It was formed in 2008 from the merger of two previous groups, the Federal Association of Citizens' Movements (German: Bundesverband der Bürgerbewegungen, BDB) formed in 2003, and Pax Europa formed in 2006.

== Activities ==
The group describes itself as a "human rights organisation" that stands for "freedom and democracy" against "Islamisation". It has lobbied at the Organization for Security and Cooperation in Europe (OSCE), often represented by Elisabeth Sabaditsch-Wolff, and has cooperated with the International Civil Liberties Alliance and the Center for Security Policy of Frank Gaffney. René Stadtkewitz has been deputy chairman of the organisation, and its national secretary is Conny Axel Meier.

In 2011, Meier held a speech at a conference in Strasbourg, France arranged by Stop Islamization of America and Stop Islamisation of Europe that also included Robert Spencer and Roberta Moore of the Jewish Division of the English Defence League.

The BPE has attempted to claim to have revived the anti-Nazi White Rose resistance movement, and when Meier spoke at the 2012 international counter-jihad conference in Brussels, he compared German Muslims to members of the Nazi Party. His statement referred to a study which revealed that half a million German Muslims openly supported Sharia over German law, which he translated to five times more than the number of Nazi Party members in 1928. One former member of the White Rose, Susanne Hirzel, was actively involved in the BPE.

=== 2024 mass stabbing ===
On 31 May 2024, the BPE held an information stand in the Mannheim market square featuring one of its most prominent activists, Michael Stürzenberger. At the event, several people were stabbed by an Afghan refugee wielding a knife. Police on the scene shot the attacker. One police officer was critically injured and died two days later after being held in an induced coma.
