= Gymnasium München Nord =

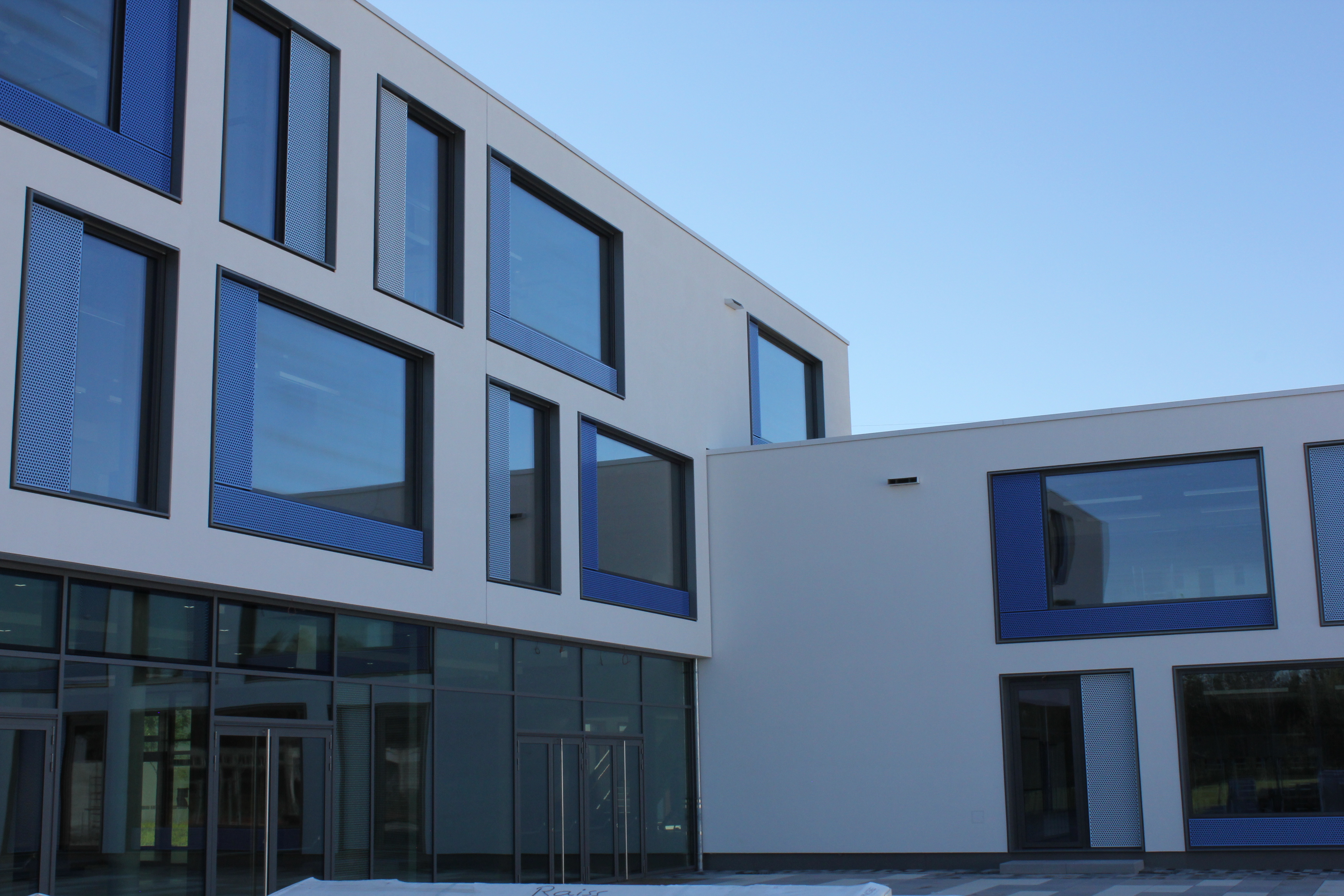

Location
- Knorrstr. 171, 80937 München; Munich; Germany
- Coordinates: 48.1995°N 11.5722°E

Information
- Type: Sports gymnasium
- Established: 2016
- Website: http://www.gym-muc-nord.de/

The Gymnasium München Nord is a gymnasium in the Munich city district Milbertshofen-Am Hart. It has languages, mathematics and science specialisms and trains a quarter of its students at a national level in a competitive Olympic sport. The school is located at the former US army Alabama Depot area.

== Description ==
The school has a capacity of 100 teachers and 1200 students. It was founded in 2016, built and operated following the principles of Rainer Schweppe. The school was seen as a group of year groups each having its own open plan multifunctional area, surrounded by the individual classrooms that those students would mainly use. Collapsing classes into larger didactic units was encouraged. It operated on an all-day use principle with student attending in the afternoon for additional reading time. Homework was done on site where teachers were available to assist. Students in the specialist stream may have a timetabled lesson then in one of their additional subjects. The school operates as a Eliteschule des Sports. One out of four of the students is trained for national and international Sport Competitions. The school has a calisthenics park, a beach volleyball court and a 40 meter long boulder wall. The school participates in "School without Racism - School with Courage". Patron is the Paralympic athlete Katharina Lang.

School trips

5th grade	School field trip
6th grade	Summer sports week
7th grade	Skiing courses
8th grade	Two-day hike
10th grade	Trip to Berlin
Q 11/12	Study trips at the end of upper school

== Alumni ==
- Franziska Kett, german professional footballer who plays for Frauen-Bundesliga club Bayern Munich and the Germany women's national team (Abitur 2025).

== Architecture ==
The building is on a 30 ha site that was part of the US Army Alabama Depot and then the Alabama Halle next to BMW Research and Innovation Centre. The site was landscaped by Hackl Hoffmann. The building was designed and built by the architects h4a Gessert + Randecker. The footprint of the building is 18.000 m^{2}, the usable area being 10.000 m^{2}. It cost in all 65 million euro, and Freistaat Bayern contributed 8 million euro.

== Public Art ==
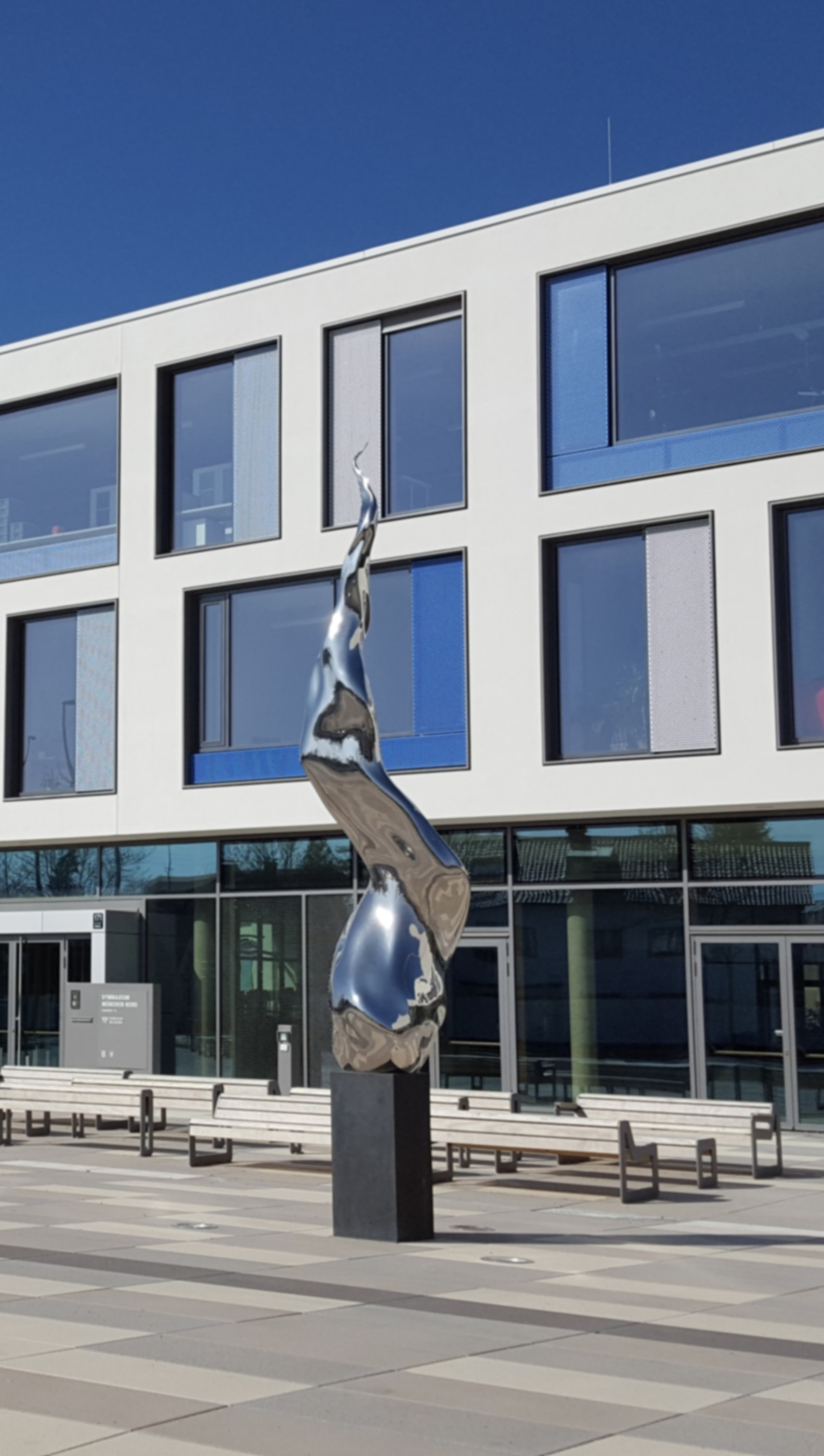
Feuer und Flamme Sculpture

As part of the German Kunst am Bau scheme the School hosts two artworks, Feuer & Flamme by the sculptor, from Bruno Wank, and Stefan Wischnewski's Auf die Plätze.
