= BMW FIZ =

BMW research campus in Munich, Germany

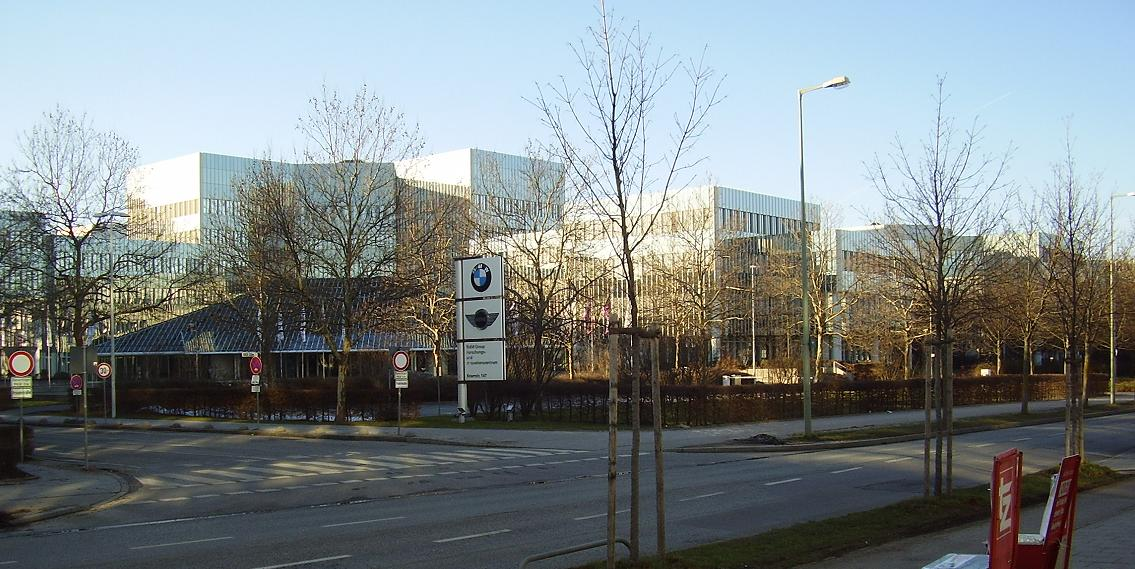
BMW FIZ

The BMW Group Forschungs- und Innovationszentrum (BMW FIZ) is the main engineering and development campus of the BMW Group. It is located in Milbertshofen-Am Hart, a district in northern Munich.

About 20,000 engineers and workers develop cars as well as motorcycles on a 500,000 m^{2} area spread out across several areas and buildings.

Since October 2017, the BMW FIZ was extended by the BMW Autonomous Driving Campus, located in Unterschleißheim about 13 km north of the main FIZ campus. There, BMW intends to colocate all BMW engineers working on autonomous driving capabilities in the cooperation with Intel.
