= Milbertshofen-Am Hart =

Borough of Munich, Germany

Coordinates: 48°11′54″N 11°34′35″E

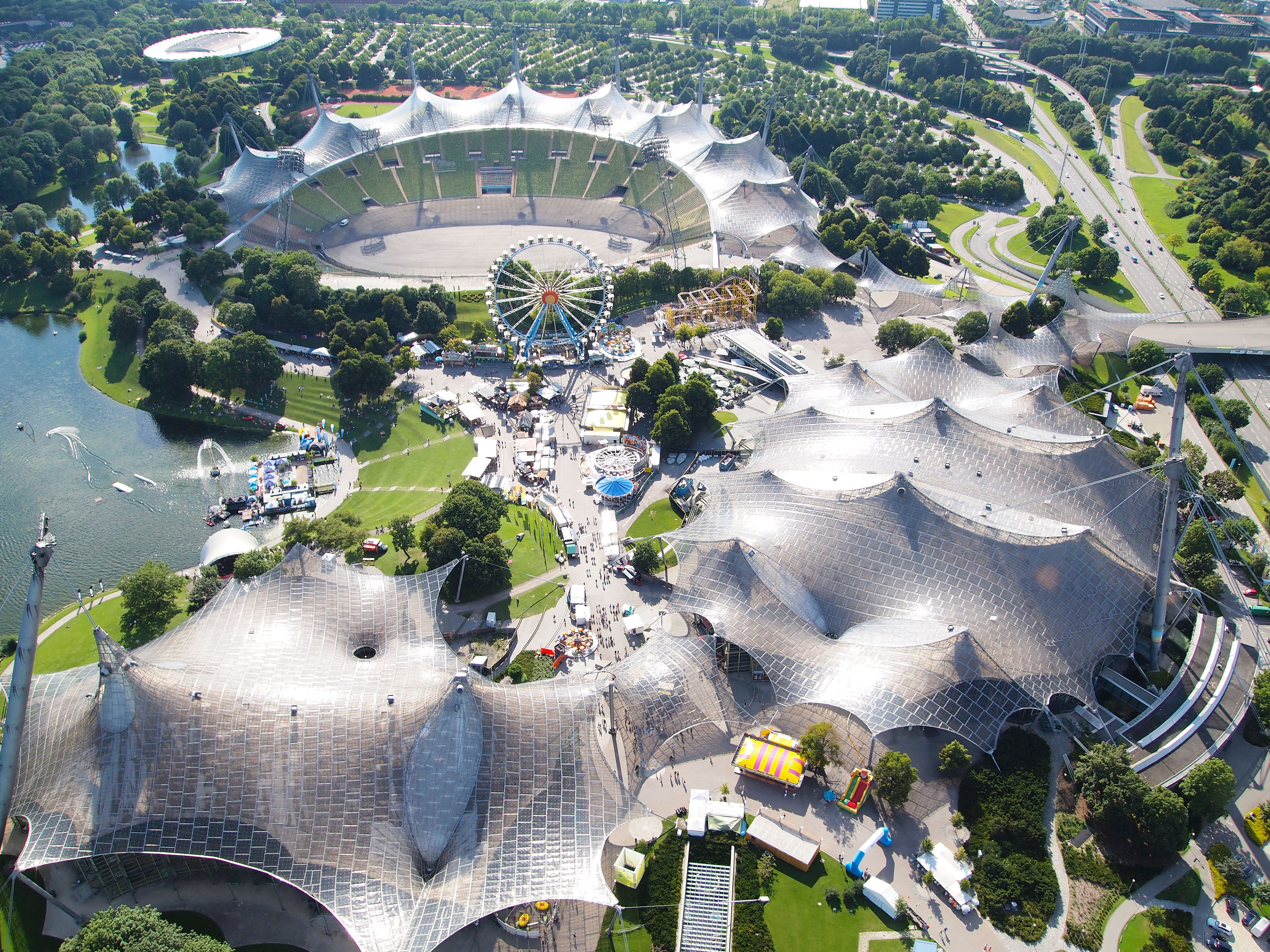
Olympiahalle, Olympic Stadium and Olympic Swim Hall

Milbertshofen (German pronunciation: [ˈmɪlbɐtsˌhoːfn̩]; Central Bavarian: Muibatshofa), Am Riesenfeld and Am Hart (German pronunciation: [am ˈhaʁt]; Central Bavarian: Am Hoart) are three boroughs situated in the north of Munich in Germany. Jointly, they form the city district 11 Milbertshofen-Am Hart. As of December 2016, the three boroughs had 76,255 inhabitants.

== Location ==
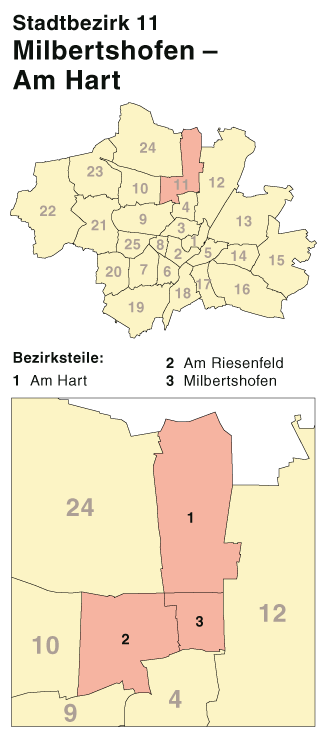
Milbertshofen-Am Hart on the map of city districts

Milbertshofen-Am Hart is surrounded by Schwabing-Freimann (east), Schwabing-West (south), Neuhausen-Nymphenburg (southwest), Moosach and Feldmoching-Hasenbergl (west). North of it comes the municipality Oberschleißheim.

== Description ==
In Milbertshofen-Am Hart is the Olympiapark (with the 291-metre-high Olympiaturm Munich's tallest building, the Olympiahalle, Olympiastadion, Erinnerungsort Olympia-Attentat, Sea Life München, Olympic Village), and the BMW Museums (BMW Welt, BMW Group Classic, BMW Museum and BMW Tower). Other notable buildings include BMW FIZ, Knorr-Bremse headquarter, Bayerisches Landesamt für Verfassungsschutz, Euro-Industriepark, Mira shopping center and Gymnasium München Nord. Green Areas include: Petuelpark, Hartelholz and Panzerwiese. The Olympiapark is the location of the Zentrale Hochschulsportanlage, Spartan Race Sprint as well as Start- and Finish location of the Munich Marathon and Start of the Wings for Life World Run Munich.
