= German Freedom Party =

Freedom – Civil Rights Party for More Freedom and Democracy Die Freiheit – Bürgerrechtspartei für mehr Freiheit und Demokratie
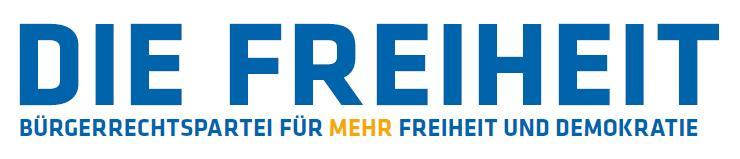
- Leader: Michael Stürzenberger
- Chairman: Karl Schmitt
- Vice-Chairman: Marc Doll
- Founder: René Stadtkewitz
- Founded: 28 October 2010
- Dissolved: 4 December 2016
- Split from: Christian Democratic Union of Germany
- Merged into: Alternative for Germany (de facto)
- Headquarters: Storkower Straße 158; 10407 Berlin
- Ideology: Conservative liberalism; Classical liberalism; Right-wing populism
- Political position: Far-right
- International affiliation: International Freedom Alliance
- Colours: Blue and orange

Freedom – Civil Rights Party for More Freedom and Democracy (German: Die Freiheit – Bürgerrechtspartei für mehr Freiheit und Demokratie), known as The Freedom (German: Die Freiheit) for short, was a political party in Germany which identified as conservative-liberal and classical liberal. Described as right-wing populist, the party was known for its criticism of Islam.

The party was founded in October 2010 by Berlin city parliamentarian René Stadtkewitz who had been expelled from the centre-right Christian Democratic Union of Germany (CDU) for inviting the Dutch politician Geert Wilders to Berlin. The party sought the implementation of a direct citizen democracy based on the Swiss model and extensive changes in immigration and integration policy.

== History ==
Freedom was founded in October 2010 by René Stadtkewitz in the wake of the immigration debate spurred by the then-member of the Executive Board of the Deutsche Bundesbank Thilo Sarrazin. The Berlin city parliamentarian Stadtkewitz was expelled from the Christian Democratic Union in 2010 after inviting Dutch politician Geert Wilders of the Party for Freedom to hold a speech in Berlin. A number of other politicians who left their respective parties joined Stadtkewitz, while prominent Islam and immigration critic Thilo Sarrazin refused participation in the new party, but fought to stay in his Social Democratic Party and stated that the immigration and integration issues had to be discussed inside the major parties. In June 2011, the party expanded, founding state associations in ten German states.

The 2011 Berlin state election was the first election the party participated in. Freedom won 1.0% of the popular vote.

The party was dissolved in 2016, with its members saying that many of its aims had been assumed by the Alternative for Germany (AfD) party. Some former Freitheit politicians switched to AfD, like the AfD-MP (as of 2025) of Brandeburg state parliament Lena Kotré.

== Ideology ==
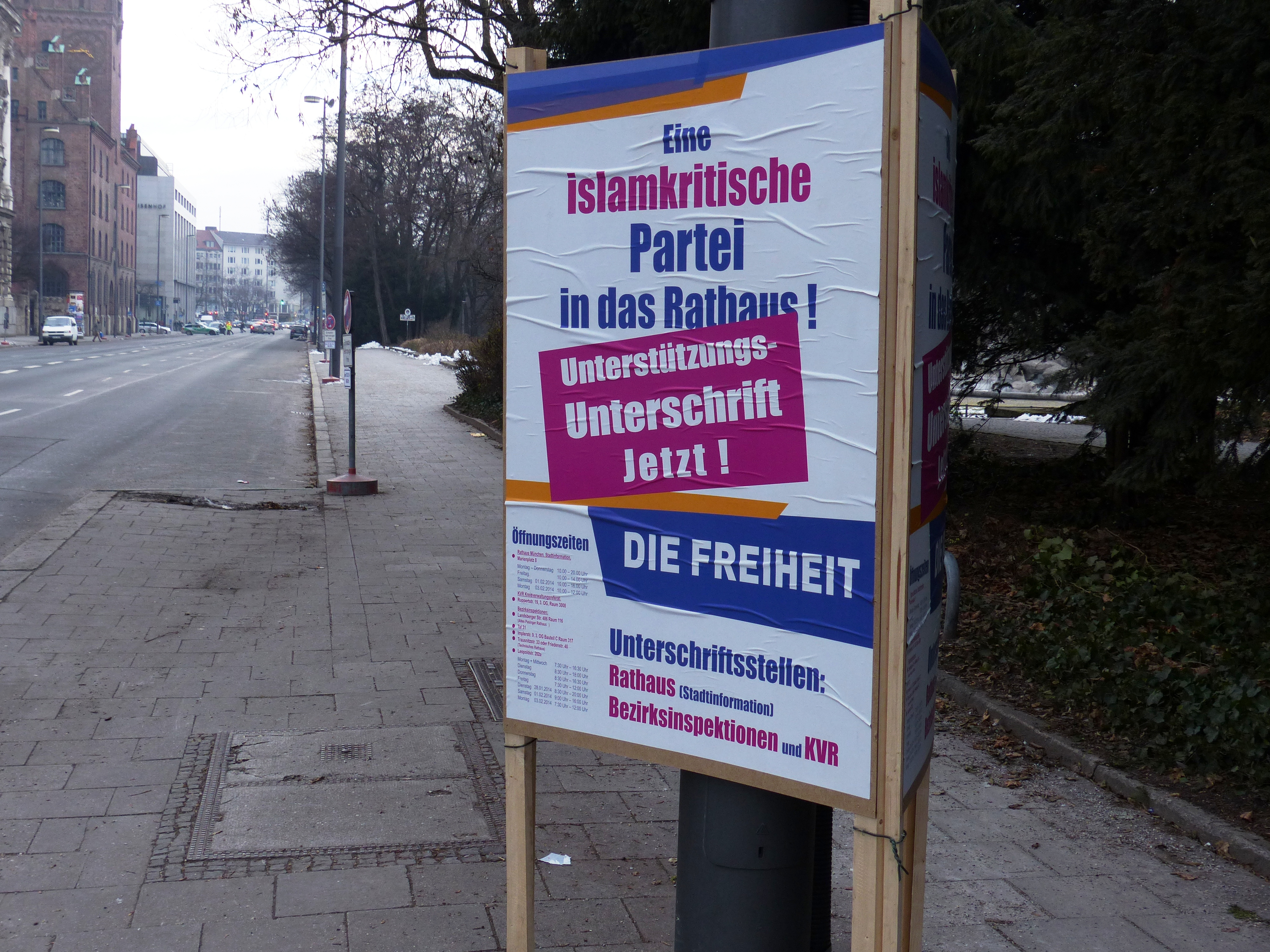
Campaign poster for the Munich local elections 2014

Freedom identifies as a conservative-liberal or classical liberal party. Stadtkewitz himself has explained that his party would be more liberal than the FDP, less statist than the SPD and more anti-political establishment than the German Greens.

Some of their core issues included:

- The introduction of direct citizen democracy based on the Swiss model.
- Tougher measures on crime
- The reduction of immigration to deal with integration issues.
- Support of Israel.
- Stricter social welfare policies.
- Withdrawal from the European Union.
- Combatting the "Islamisation of Germany."

The program of the party was modelled on that of the Dutch Party for Freedom, founded and led by Geert Wilders.

Some German media have variously described the party as right-wing populist, islamophobic, and conservative.

The party called for critical observation of imams, mosques, and Islamic schools and for a review of Islamic organizations to ensure their compliance with German laws, and condemned efforts to build a parallel legal structure based on sharia.

== International cooperation ==
Freedom party received support from Dutch politician Geert Wilders, leader and founder of the Party for Freedom, who announced his intention to include the party in his International Freedom Alliance project. Politician Oskar Freysinger of the Swiss People's Party gave a speech on the occasion of Freedom's founding event in Bavaria. In 2012, the party took part in a "Global Counter Jihad rally" in Stockholm, Sweden along with other groups such as Stop Islamization of Nations (SION), and party leader Michael Stürzenberger was simultaneously leader of the German section of Stop Islamisation of Europe (SIOE).
