= Bavarian Office for the Protection of the Constitution =

German regional administrative authority

Coordinates: 48.1922°N 11.5712°E

- Bayerisches Landesamt für Verfassungsschutz (BayLfV)

Agency overview
- Formed: 22 November 1950; 75 years ago
- Headquarters: Munich, Bavaria
- Employees: 552 (2018)
- Annual budget: €56 million (2019)
- Agency executive: Burkhard Körner, President
- Parent agency: Bavarian Ministry of the Interior
- Website: www.verfassungsschutz.bayern.de

The Bayerisches Landesamt für Verfassungsschutz (BayLfV, "Bavarian Office for the Protection of the Constitution") is the domestic intelligence agency of the Free State of Bavaria. Its main function is the observation and surveillance of anti-constitutional activities in Bavaria. The Office is subordinate to the Bavarian Ministry of the Interior. It cooperates with the federal agency, the Bundesamt für Verfassungsschutz, and the 15 other state agencies. It has around 450 employees, and its headquarters is in Munich. Its work is governed by a state law, the Bayerisches Verfassungsschutzgesetz.

The office monitors political extremists from the left and the right, Islamist extremists and scientology. It is also tasked with the prevention of military and industrial espionage and of monitoring organized crime.

According to a 2021 report from the US State Department, BayLfV was monitoring organisations such as the NDP, Der Flügel, Young Alternative and The Third Way.

== History ==
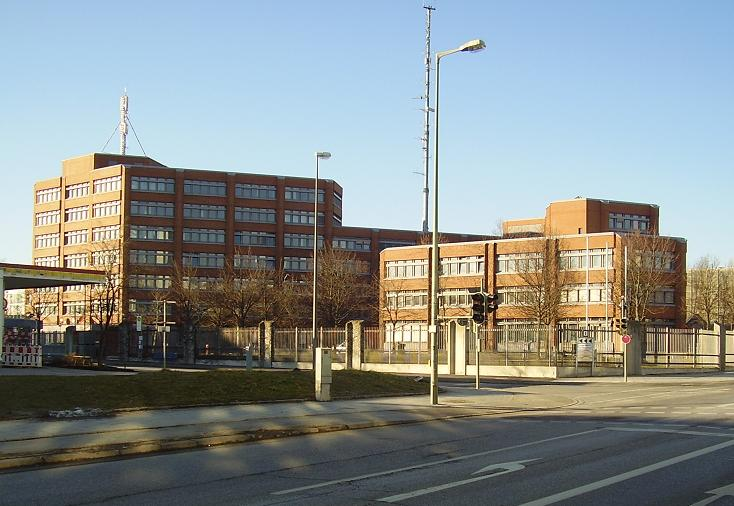
Office building in Milbertshofen-Am Hart in the north of Munich

The Bavarian Office for the Protection of the Constitution was established by law on November 22, 1950 with retroactive effect from November 1, 1950. On 20 February 1950, the Office of the US High Commissioner for Germany, Office of the State Commissioner for Bavaria, had authorized the Bavarian state government in writing to establish a "small office for the purpose of securing intelligence on subversive activities." According to the Federal Protection of the Constitution Act, which came into force on September 29, 1950, all states had to designate an agency to deal with matters relating to the protection of the constitution.

According to a study commissioned by the Bavarian Green Party state parliamentary group, the state office took on numerous people with intelligence service experience from the ranks of the Gestapo when it was founded. Examples include SS-Hauptsturmführer Leonhard Halmanseger, who had worked in the Reich Security Main Office to combat political opponents of the Nazis, and SS-Sturmbannführer Joseph Schreieder, who had been responsible for combating the Dutch resistance at the Gestapo before 1945 and who came to the State Office via the BND's predecessor, the Gehlen Organization. In 1951, the US occupying power rejected four of six proposed new officials for the Office for the Protection of the Constitution, citing their past. Among those rejected was Halmanseger, for whom the then Bavarian Interior Minister Wilhelm Hoegner (SPD) found a pragmatic solution: he officially became an officer of the Bavarian Border Police, but in fact worked for the Office for the Protection of the Constitution. Other members of the Bavarian Office for the Protection of the Constitution also initially became official employees of the border police. As a result of the Cold War, the reservations of the US services against the experienced anti-communists diminished, so that people like Halmanseger now officially became constitution protection officers. By 1965, the "small office" authorized by the Allies had grown from an original staff of 26 to 173 employees.

At the end of the 1980s, the Bavarian Office for the Protection of the Constitution and the Upper Bavaria Police Headquarters moved into an office building built for the two authorities in Knorrstraße in Munich's Am Hart district.

From 1991 onwards, the Bavarian State Office played a key role in setting up the State Office for the Protection of the Constitution in Saxony.

Since October 2004, the Bavarian Office for the Protection of the Constitution has been working together with the State Office of Criminal Investigation as part of the BIRGiT (Beschleunigte Identifizierung und Rückführung von Gefährdern aus dem Bereich des islamistischen Terrorismus/Extremismus, accelerated identification and repatriation of people at risk from Islamist terrorism/extremism) working group.
