= List of tallest buildings in Munich =

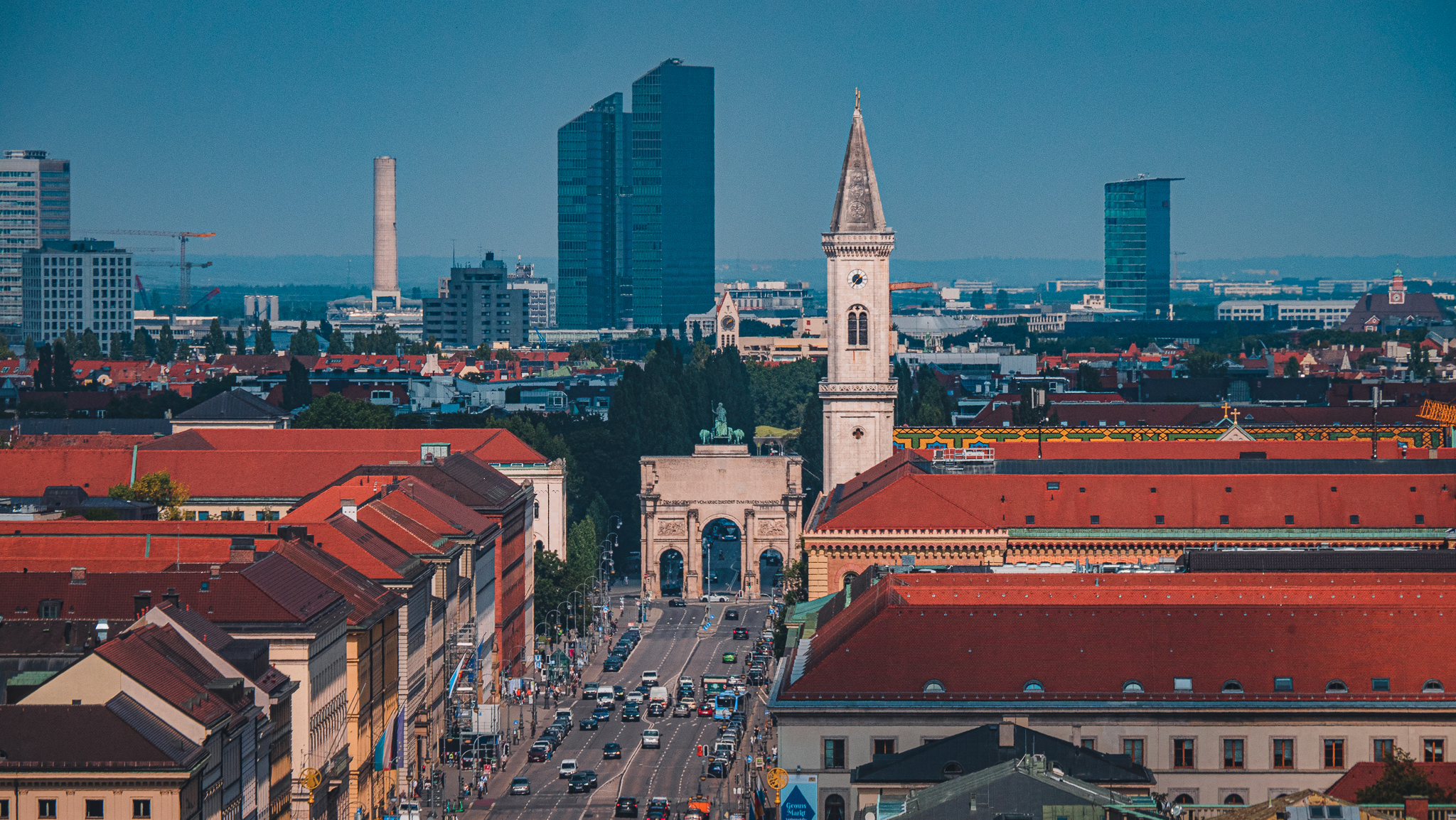
View over Ludwigstraße, Highlight Towers in the background

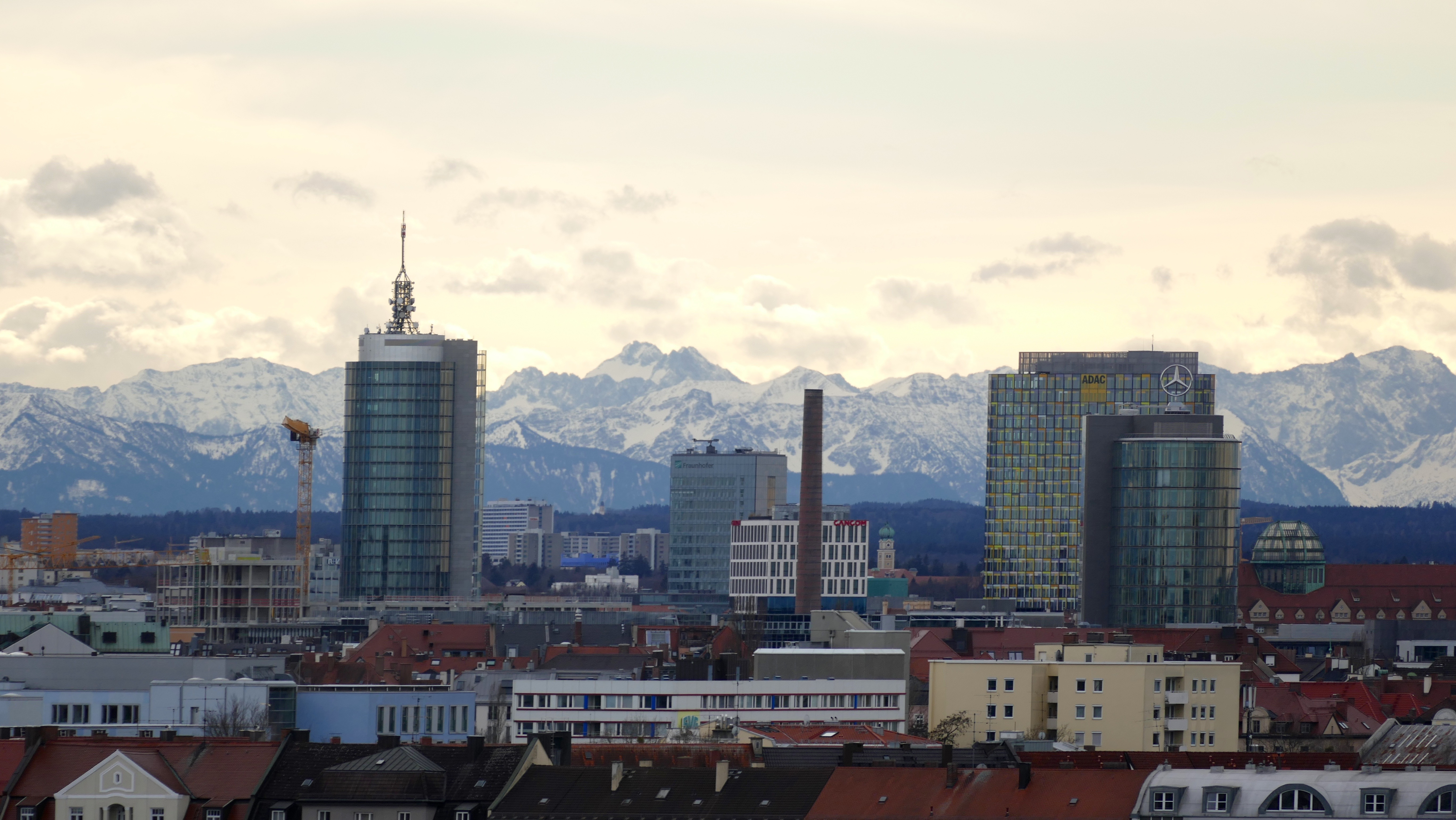
Central Tower Munich, ADAC-Zentrale and Mercedes-Benz München. Alps in the background.

This list of tallest buildings in Munich ranks high-rise buildings and some important landmarks that reach a height of 50 meters (164 feet). The history of skyscrapers in Munich began with the 12-storey, 45.5 m (149 ft) Old Technical Town Hall. The tallest structure in the city is by far the 291-meter-high Olympic Tower, a television tower built in 1968.

Most high-rise buildings in Munich are spread across the city. However, there are also small clusters, such as Arabellapark, where several high-rise buildings are concentrated. The HVB-Tower, Arabella-Hochhaus, the BayWa-Hochhaus and The Westin Hotel are located here.

Following a referendum in November 2004, Munich's high-rise buildings have since been limited to the Frauenkirche tower height of 99 meters, even outside the city center. However, there are repeated initiatives to reconsider this, also due to price developments on the rental and purchase market for real estate. Munich does not yet have an overarching high-rise master plan, but high-rise studies have been published several times. The Munich City Council advocates the construction of high-rise buildings from the Mittlerer Ring (Bundesstraße 2 R).

Rank	Name	Image	Height m (ft)	Floors	Year completed	Use / Note
	Olympiaturm		291 m (955 ft)		1968	Telecommunications tower, Tallest structure in Munich.
1	Hochhaus Uptown München		146 m (479 ft)	38	2004	Tallest skyscraper in Munich and tallest in the state of Bavaria.
2	Highlight I		126 m (413 ft)	33	2004	Tallest twin towers in Munich. Best known tenants of the buildings are the IT and consulting firms Unify and Fujitsu Technology Solutions, as well as IBM.
3	HVB-Tower		114 m (374 ft)	27	1981	Headquarters of HypoVereinsbank, Arabellapark
4	Highlight II		113 m (371 ft)	28	2004	
5	SV-Hochhaus		104 m (341 ft)	28	2008	Headquarters of Süddeutscher Verlag
6	BMW-Vierzylinder		101 m (331 ft)	22	1972	Headquarters of BMW
	Frauenkirche		98.57 m (323 ft)		1488	Cathedral of Our Lady - It is a landmark and is considered a symbol of the Bavarian capital city.
	St. Paul's Church, Munich		97 m (318 ft)		1906	
	Heilig-Kreuz-Church		95 m (312 ft)		1886	
7	ADAC-Zentrale		93 m (305 ft)	23	2011	Headquarters of ADAC
	Mariahilf-Church		92 m (302 ft)		1839	
	New St. John's Church, Munich		91 m (299 ft)		1874	
	St. Peter's Church, Munich		91 m (299 ft)		1607	
8	Olympia Tower		88 m (289 ft)	19	1972	Residential
9	Seniorenresidenz am Westpark		87 m (285 ft)	27	1972	Senior residences
10	Werk4		86 m (282 ft)	24	2020	Hotel
11	Münchner Tor		85 m (279 ft)	24	2003	Office
11	Central Tower Munich		85 m (279 ft)	23	2003	Office - Height with antenna 115 m (377 ft)
	New Town Hall (Munich)		85 m (279 ft)		1905	New Town hall forms the northern part of Marienplatz.
13	Skyline Tower (Munich)		84.2 m (276 ft)	23	2010	Office
14	Sky Tower		83.6 m (274 ft)	20	2018	Office
15	Riesstraße 82		83 m (272 ft)	22	1972	Residential
16	Helene-Mayer-Ring 10		76 m (249 ft)	20	1972	Residential
17	BayWa-Hochhaus (Sternhaus)		76 m (249 ft)	21	1969	Headquarters of BayWa, Arabellapark
18	Siemens-Hochhaus		75 m (246 ft)	23	1963	Office
18	Arabella Hochhaus		75 m (246 ft)	23	1969	Hotel, Arabellapark
20	Blue Tower		72.3 m (237 ft)	18	2018	Office
	Theatine Church		71 m (233 ft)		1675	Roman Catholic church
21	MO82		70 m (230 ft)	21	2018	Hotel
22	BR-Hauptfunkhaus		68 m (223 ft)	19	1976	Main broadcasting center of Bayerischer Rundfunk
22	Mercedes-Benz München		68 m (223 ft)	16	2003	Seat of Mercedes-Benz (Munich)
24	Hotel The Westin Grand München		65 m (213 ft)	23	1971	Hotel, Arabellapark
24	Fraunhofer-Haus		65 m (213 ft)	17	2003	Headquarters of Fraunhofer Society
24	Highrise One		65 m (213 ft)	17	2017	Office
24	OPTINEO		65 m (213 ft)	17	2022	Office
28	DEBA-Hochhaus		64 m (210 ft)	20	1969	Residential
29	Technisches Rathaus		63 m (207 ft)	19	2000	Seat of City administration
30	NH-Hotel Deutscher Kaiser		60.5 m (198 ft)	17	1956	Hotel
31	Universitätsklinikum		60 m (197 ft)	17	1977	University Hospital
31	Kap West Hirschgarten 1		60 m (197 ft)	17	2020	Office
31	NEO		60 m (197 ft)	16	2020	Mixed use
31	Hanns-Seidel-Haus		60 m (197 ft)	19	1973	Residential
35	Pharao-Haus		58 m (190 ft)	19	1974	Residential
36	Rümannstraße 61		57 m (187 ft)	16	1967	Residential
37	The Seven		54 m (177 ft)	16	2014	Residential
38	White Tower		53.6 m (176 ft)	15	2018	Hotel
39	Buschingstraße 45		53.4 m (175 ft)	15	1956	Residential
39	Buschingstraße 43		53.4 m (175 ft)	15	1956	Residential
41	Tantris-Hochhaus		53 m (174 ft)	15	1971	Residential
41	Friends-Towers		53 m (174 ft)	15	2014	Residential
41	Kap West Hirschgarten 2		53 m (174 ft)	15	2020	Office
44	Sternhochhaus I (Siemenssiedlung)		51 m (167 ft)	17	1954	Residential
44	Sternhochhaus II (Siemenssiedlung)		51 m (167 ft)	17	1954	Residential
44	Sternhochhaus III (Siemenssiedlung)		51 m (167 ft)	17	1954	Residential
47	Berufsgenossenschaft Holz und Metall		50 m (164 ft)	13	1999	Office
47	Ten Towers		50 m (164 ft)	15	2005	Deutsche Telekom administration building. Consists of ten interconnected buildings.
47	Isar Tower Nord		50 m (164 ft)	16	2014	Residential
47	Isar Tower Süd		50 m (164 ft)	16	2014	Residential
47	Isarbelle		50 m (164 ft)	16	2014	Residential
47	Sternenhimmel		50 m (164 ft)	16	2013	Residential
47	Alpenglühen		50 m (164 ft)	16	2014	Residential

== Under construction ==
Name	Height (m)	Height (ft)	Floors	Year
TRIDEA (BVK-Zentrale)	100 (originally 115 meters planned)	328	26	2028
One Rock	70	230	20	2026
Hochhaus L438	70	230	18	2026

== Proposed ==
Name	Height (m)	Height (ft)	Floors	Year
Paketposthalle Towers	2x155	509	39	Unknown
Opes Tower	88 (originally 98 meters planned)	289	23	2029
Hochhaus am Hauptbahnhof	69	226	18	Unknown
ZAM	61	200	18	Unknown
Hoffmann	60	197	14	Unknown
R.evo Neuperlach	55	180	17	Unknown
Heimeran	52	171	14	Unknown
Vertical Garden	52	171	16	Unknown
Am Oberwiesenfeld			13	2029

== Demolished ==
Name	Image	Height m (ft)	Floors	Opened	Demolished
Scheibenhaus		75 m (246 ft)	23	1969	2010
ESG-Hochhaus		63 m (207 ft)	16		2015–2016
Agfa-Hochhaus		52 m (171 ft)	14	1959	2008

== See also ==
- List of tallest buildings in Germany
- List of tallest structures in Germany
