= Arabella (disambiguation) =

Arabella is an opera in three acts by Richard Strauss.

Arabella may also refer to:

== People ==
- Arabella (given name), a feminine given name - includes list of people and fictional characters named Arabella

== Film, TV and books ==
- Arabella (1917 film), a Polish silent film melodrama
- Arabella (1924 film), a German silent drama film
- Arabella (1967 film), an English-language Italian comedy film
- Arabella (novel), a historical romance novel by Georgette Heyer
- Arabella (talk show), a German talk show
- AraBella (Philippine TV series), a Philippine television drama series

== Music ==
- "Arabella" (Arctic Monkeys song), 2014
- "Arabella" (Nathan Evans and Saint Phnx song), 2025

== Places ==
- Irbid, Jordan, a city
- Arabella, Highland, Scotland, a village
- Arabella Station, in New Orleans, Louisiana
- 841 Arabella, an asteroid
- Arabella Country Estate, a residential estate and golf course in South Africa
- Arabella Hochhaus, a high-rise hotel and office building in Munich

== Other ==
- Arabella Advisors, a Washington, D.C.–based for-profit company that advises left-leaning donors and nonprofits about where to give money
- Arabella, a wooden 37-foot sailing ketch built in Granby, Massachusetts

== See also ==
- Arabela (disambiguation)
- Arbella
