= Arabella (given name) =

Arabella is a female given name, possibly of Greek, Latin, or Celtic origin.

== Origin and history ==
The earliest known use of the name in settlements was the modern-day northern Jordanian city of Irbid, known in ancient times as Arbela (Άρβηλα in Ancient Greek). With regards to personal names, the first attested usage was a medieval Scottish Latin name: Arabella de Leuchars (c.1135–1203), a granddaughter of the Scottish king William the Lion. The earliest English use was the granddaughter of Arabella de Leuchars, Arabella de Quincy (c.1186–1258), the daughter of Saer de Quincy, 1st Earl of Winchester.

Typical for medieval bearers of the name, both these Arabellas are also documented as Orabel[la] and Orabilia, and in documents that Latinize names as Orabilis. A Latin construction which suffixes orare with ābilis interprets the name's meaning as "given to prayer" or "entreatable". Orabilis has been suggested as the root of the name Arabella and its variants.

However, Orabilis may have been a purely speculative Latinized form, rather than Arabella's true root. Its usage, long being confined to the island of Great Britain with no equivalent names in evident use elsewhere, would argue for a British Isles origin, such as the Celtic òr a bheul "golden mouth", or the Scottish equivalent of Bel-óir, the Irish epithet for Saint Gregory the Great.

Another theory suggests that the name Arabella, like the name Annabel, is a Scottish development of Amabel, whose ultimate root is the Latin amabilis (lovable), with the name passing to Great Britain via France.

The first high-profile English bearer of the name was royal claimant Arabella Stuart (1575–1615), also referred to as Arbella, a great-granddaughter of Margaret Tudor. The name Arabella remained rare in England until the Restoration ushered in a fashion for ornate names.

Arabella Fermor (1696–1737) was a celebrated London beauty, whose highest profile evocation was as the heroine of Alexander Pope's 1712 poem The Rape of the Lock, under the name "Belinda". Pope introduced the 1717 edition of this poem with a dedication of "To Mrs Arabella Fermor".

Arabella remained fairly popular in Georgian and Victorian Britain. It began to decline in use in the late 1800s, and reached a nadir in the 1940s, when there were only 15 recorded births with that name. The name has seen a steady resurgence since the 1990s, reaching No. 95 in England and Wales in 2015.

Despite the potential for being valued as a "heritage name", as it was the name of the flagship of the Winthrop Fleet (see Arbella), Arabella was not as popular in the United States. A rare high-profile American bearer of the name was Arabella Mansfield (née Babb) (1846–1911), the first female to pass a United States bar examination: Mansfield's birth name was Belle Aurelia Babb, but she began using Arabella as her first name in her first year of law school in 1862.

Arabella ranked in the Top 1000 most given names for American newborn girls in the 1880s, with a median ranking from that decade's respective yearly tallies being No. 969. Arabella then became progressively rarer in the United States, until a Top 1000 re-entry on the tally of the most given names for American newborn girls for the year 2006, which ranked it at No. 653. The name has continued to gain favor, ranking on the tally of the most given names for American newborn girls for the year 2014 at No. 174.

== People named Arabella ==
- Arabella Arbenz (1940–1965), Guatemalan model and actor
- Arabella Buckley (1840–1929), English writer and science educator
- Arabella Bushnell, Canadian actress
- Arabella Campbell (born 1973), Canadian artist
- Arabella Castro Quiñónez (born 1955), Guatemalan politician
- Arabella Chapman (1859–1927), American maker of photo albums
- Arabella Churchill (charity founder) (1949–2007), English charity founder, festival organiser, and fundraiser
- Arabella Churchill (royal mistress) (1648–1730), mistress of King James II
- Arabella Denny (1707–1792), Irish philanthropist
- Arabella Dorman (born 1975), British painter
- Arabella Edge, Australian novelist
- Arabella Fermor (1696–1737), model for the character Belinda in the poem The Rape of the Lock
- Arabella Field (born 1965), American actor
- Arabella Fields (1879–1931), American singer
- Arabella Goddard (1836–1922), English pianist
- Arabella Holzbog (born 1966), British-American actress
- Arabella Hunt (1662–1705), English vocalist and lutenist
- Arabella Huntington (circa 1850–1924), American philanthropist
- Arabella Jeffereyes (died 1810), Irish philanthropist
- Arabella Johnson (1597–1630), early American settler
- Arabella Kenealy (1859–1938), British writer and physician
- Arabella Kiesbauer (born 1969), German-Austrian TV presenter, writer and actor
- Arabella Lawrence (1787–1873), English educator
- Arabella Lennox-Boyd (born 1938), Italian-born English garden designer
- Arabella Mansfield (1846–1911), first female lawyer in the United States
- Arabella McKenzie (born 1999), Australian rugby union player
- Arabella Menage (1782–1817), British actress and ballet dancer
- Arabella Moreton (died 1727), British poet
- Arabella Morton (born 2000), Australian actress
- Arabella Ng (born 2001), Hong Kong alpine skier
- Arabella (Pinillos; born María Margarita Pinillos in 1950), Colombian salsa singer
- Arabella Plantin (1700–?), British novelist
- Arabella Pollen (born 1961), English fashion designer and author
- Arabella Rankin (1871–1943), Scottish painter
- Arabella Page Rodman (1867–1955), American civic leader
- Arabella Elizabeth Roupell (1817–1914), English painter
- Arabella Sear-Watkins (born 2006), British figure skater
- Arabella Scott (1886–1980), Scottish suffragette
- Arabella Smith, Turks and Caicos Islands politician
- Arabella Stanton (born 2013/2014), British actress
- Arabella Steinbacher (born 1981), German violinist
- Arabella Sullivan (1796–1839), British writer
- Lady Arbella Stuart (1575–1615), also spelled Arabella, considered a possible successor to Queen Elizabeth I of England
- Arabella Valpy (1833–1910), New Zealand pioneer
- Arabella Weir (born 1957), Scottish comedian, actress and writer

== Fictional characters named Arabella ==
- Arabella, character in the comic opera of the same name with music by Richard Strauss and a German libretto by Hugo von Hofmannsthal. Premiered in 1933.
- Arabella, heroine of The Female Quixote (1752) by Charlotte Lennox
- Arabella, character in the animated series Shimmer and Shine
- Arabella Allen, Mr. Winkle's love interest in Charles Dickens' novel The Pickwick Papers (1837).
- Arabella Bishop, heroine of the 1922 novel Captain Blood by Rafael Sabatini
  - the above as portrayed in the films Captain Blood (1924) and (1935) by respectively Jean Paige and Olivia de Havilland
- Arabella Babe Carey, character in the ABC-TV soap opera All My Children, introduced in 2003 by Alexa Havins
- Arabella Donn, wife of the title character in the novel Jude the Obscure (1895) by Thomas Hardy
- Arabella Figg, a squib, member of the Order of the Phoenix, in the Harry Potter books
- Lady Arabella Gresham, major character in the 1858 novel Doctor Thorne by Anthony Trollope
  - the above as portrayed by actress Rebecca Front in the 2016 ITV series Doctor Thorne
- Arabella Rittenhouse, ingenue role portrayed by Lillian Roth in the Marx Brothers' Animal Crackers (1930)
- Arabella Strange, wife of title character Jonathan Strange in Jonathan Strange and Mr Norrell (2004) by Susanna Clarke
- Arabella Tallant, heroine of the 1949 novel Arabella by Georgette Heyer
- Arabella Trefoil, anti-heroine in The American Senator (1875) by Anthony Trollope
- Arabella Wilmot, bride to George Primrose in The Vicar of Wakefield (1766) by Oliver Goldsmith
- Queen Arabella Skydancer: A character in The Unicorn Chronicles (1994) book series in which she was the long-lived Queen of the Unicorns for many centuries until her long-lost granddaughter was found, as the elderly human woman Ivy Morris, and restored to her true unicorn form and name of Amalia Flickerfoot
- Arabella Baylor: main character of the Hidden Legacy series by the American writing duo Ilona Andrews
- Arabella, heroine of the fictional play The Trials of Arabella, written by the character Briony in Ian McEwan's novel Atonement (2001).
- Arabella, character from Arctic Monkeys song that combines the name of band frontman Alex Turner's girlfriend (actress-model Arielle Vandenberg), and Jane Fonda's titular character in the 1968 French-Italian science fiction film by Roger Vadim, Barbarella.

== See also ==
- Arabella (disambiguation)
