= ADAC Headquarters =

High-rise building in Munich, Germany

- ADAC-Zentrale (German)
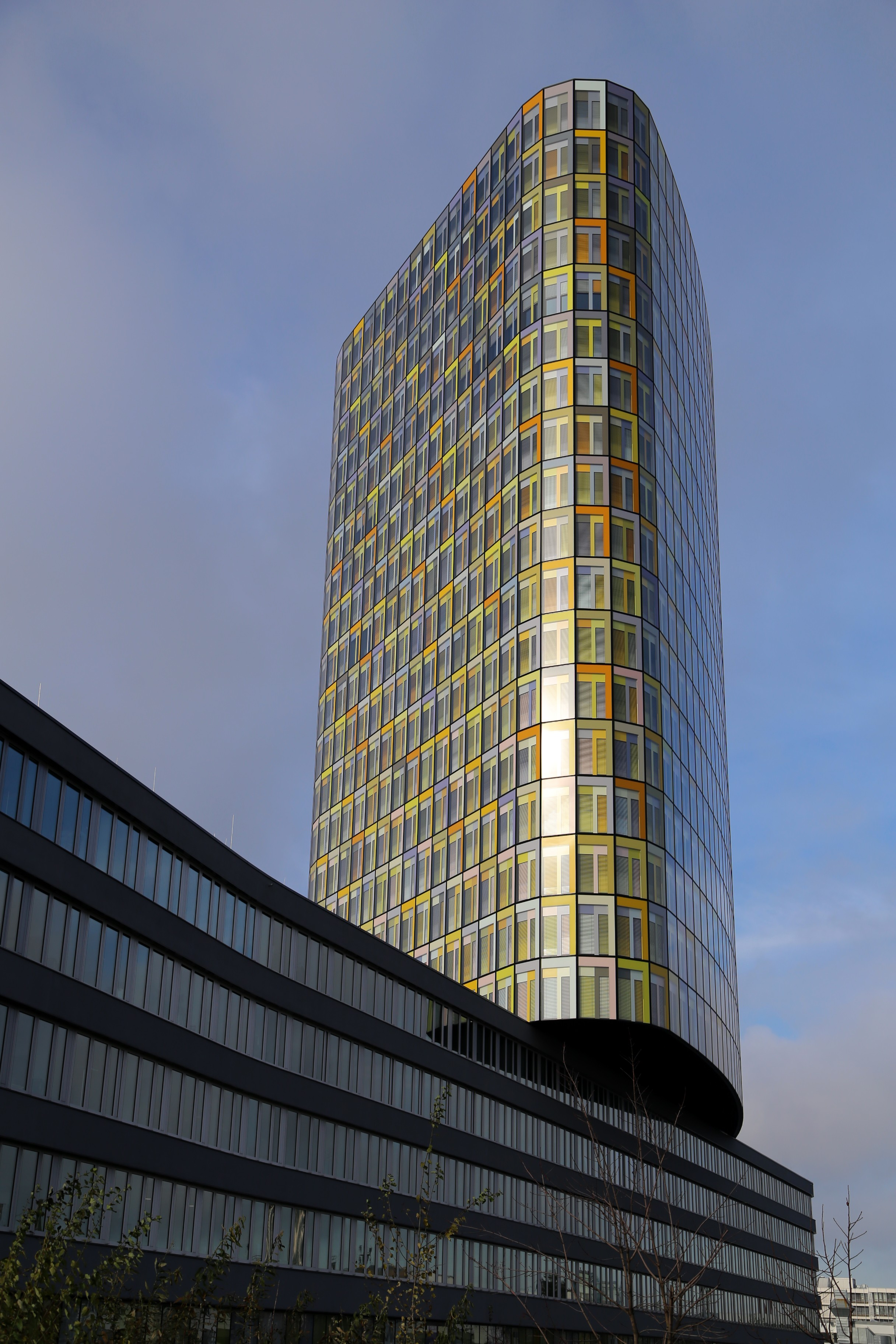
- Interactive map of the ADAC Headquarters area

General information
- Status: Completed
- Type: Office
- Location: Munich, Germany, 19 Hansastraße, 80686 Munich, Germany
- Coordinates: 48.13353°N 11.52905°E
- Construction started: 2006
- Completed: 2011
- Opened: March 22, 2012
- Cost: € 320,000,000

Height
- Roof: 93 m (305 ft)

Technical details
- Structural system: Concrete
- Floor count: 23
- Floor area: 129,500 m^{2} (1,390,000 sq ft)
- Lifts/elevators: Kone

Design and construction
- Architect: Sauerbruch Hutton
- Structural engineer: Werner Sobek Group GmbH

The ADAC Headquarters (German: ADAC-Zentrale) is a high-rise office building in the Sendling-Westpark district of Munich, Germany. Built between 2006 and 2011, the tower stands at 93 m (305 ft) tall with 23 floors and is the current 7th tallest building in Munich.

== History ==
In 2001, the ADAC decided to build a new headquarters in Munich. In 2003, ADAC President Peter Meyer presented initial plans, which led to a restricted implementation competition, to which nine architectural firms were invited. The jury included architects Stephan Braunfels, Jörg Homeier, Ulrike Lauber, Karl-Heinz Petzinka, Albert Speer and Hadi Teherani, who selected five of the submitted designs, from which the winner was chosen on 23 March 2004. In addition to first prize for the design by Sauerbruch Hutton, two third prizes went to the Munich firms Goetz and Hootz and Allmann Sattler Wappner. The competition designs by Schleburg from Rosenheim and Hentrich-Petschnigg & Partner from Düsseldorf were purchased. The plan envisaged that the headquarters would be handed over ready for occupancy by 2008 at the latest.

== Architecture ==
=== Concept ===
After the ADAC initially commissioned Sauerbruch Hutton to carry out the design work in May 2005 – as part of a general planning team led by a third party – the ADAC parted ways with the general planning team in November of the same year and Sauerbruch Hutton took over its role. The design work was completed by September 2006, and the general contractor tender was finally completed in May 2007. The approaches, in conjunction with the incoming offers, resulted in costs being overrun compared to the original approaches, as a result of which the ADAC again changed the project management. The tensions that then arose between the ADAC and the general planning team ultimately led to Sauerbruch Hutton terminating the contract in September 2009. By this time, according to the company itself, 90% of the planning had been drawn up and was subsequently largely implemented in this form. The construction costs had risen from the originally planned 230 to around 320 million euros.

=== Construction ===
The property is located in the immediate vicinity of Garmischer Straße, part of the Mittlerer Ring, and the combined underground and S-Bahn station Heimeranplatz. In the front part of the property is the listed Sander Villa, a commercial building from 1909. The rear is bordered by the Munich–Holzkirchen railway line.

Construction began in 2006 and consists of two main sections: a five- storey base, which is shaped like an amoeba and is characterised by its rounded edges, and on top of this a further 18 high-rise floors. In contrast to the more discreetly designed façade of the base, the high-rise body has an effective design of the 30,000 square metre glass façade. The 22 different colours of the 1,152 façade elements develop their play of colours like a mosaic. The colours were chosen primarily based on the brand colour of the client. In addition to the individual and open-plan offices, the entire complex includes a visitor and conference centre, a casino, a printing works, meeting rooms with video conferencing equipment and a television studio. The substructure is formed by a three-storey underground car park.

While it was initially expected that the building would be ready for occupancy in 2006 or 2007, the cost increases and further discussions about planning (about possible structural deficiencies) led to standstills on the construction site in the summer of 2008 and during 2009. As a result, the handover of use was postponed until the summer of 2011, to November 2011 and finally to the following December. The opening took place in March 2012. The previous ADAC headquarters at Westpark had already been sold in 2009.

The historic Sander Villa on the property was renovated by the ADAC, largely restoring the original façade. It is now used by the association's library and archive, as well as a conference room.

== Controversies ==
A legal dispute has been pending at the Munich Regional Court since December 2010 regarding the assessment of the termination of the contract by Sauerbruch Hutton and the disagreements preceding it.

== See also ==
- List of tallest buildings in Munich
- List of tallest buildings in Germany

== Gallery ==
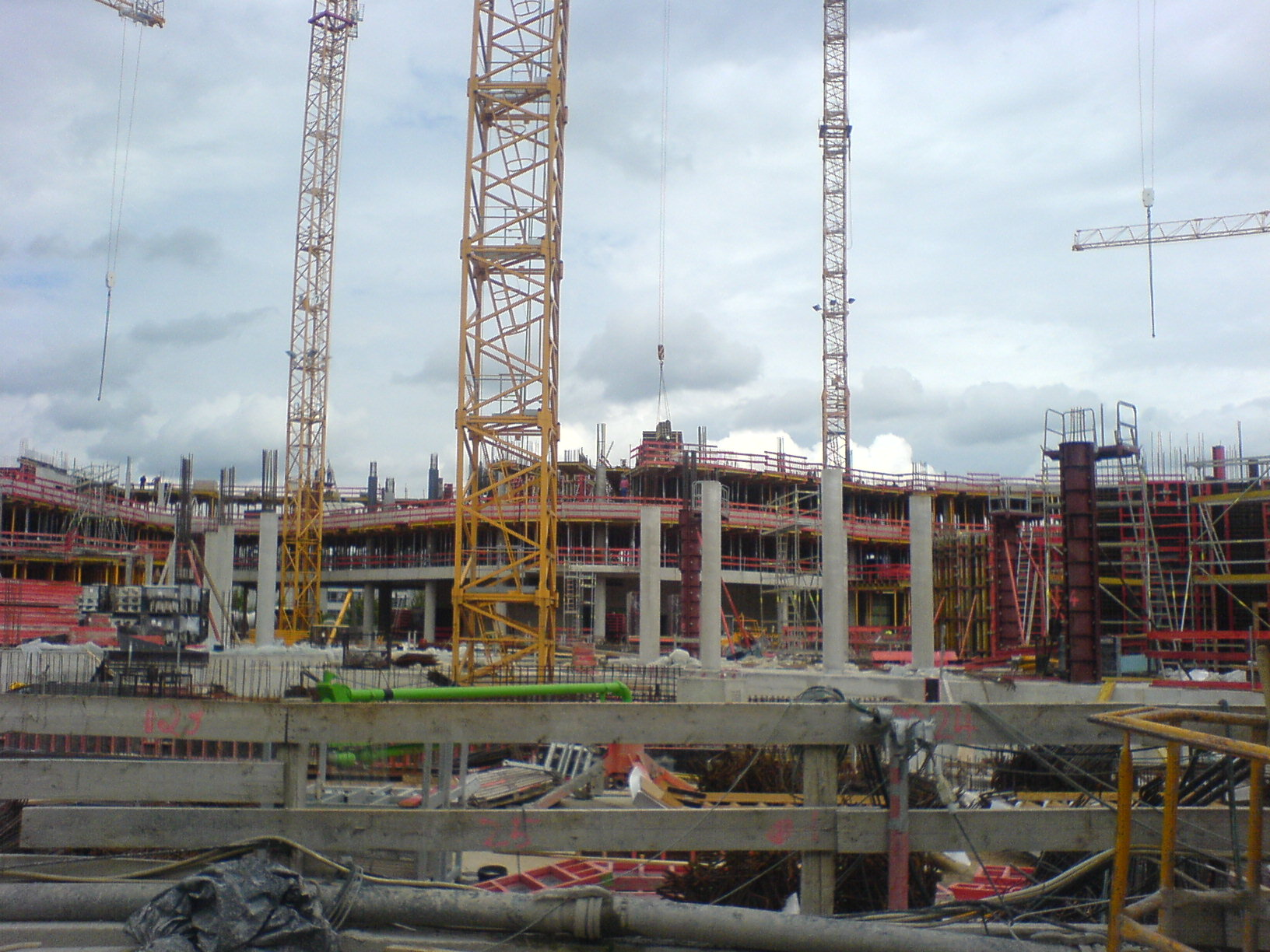
August 2009

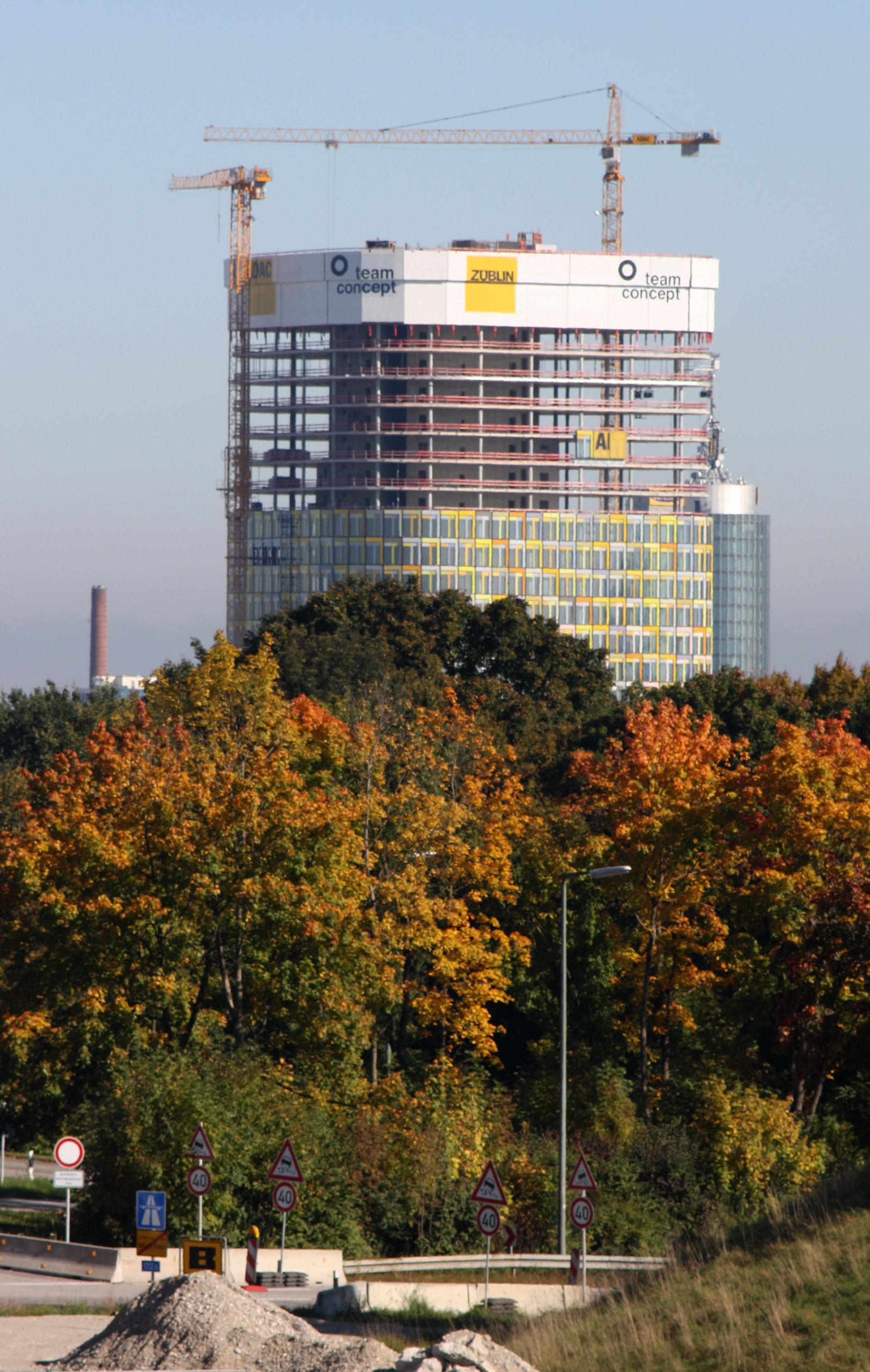
October 2010

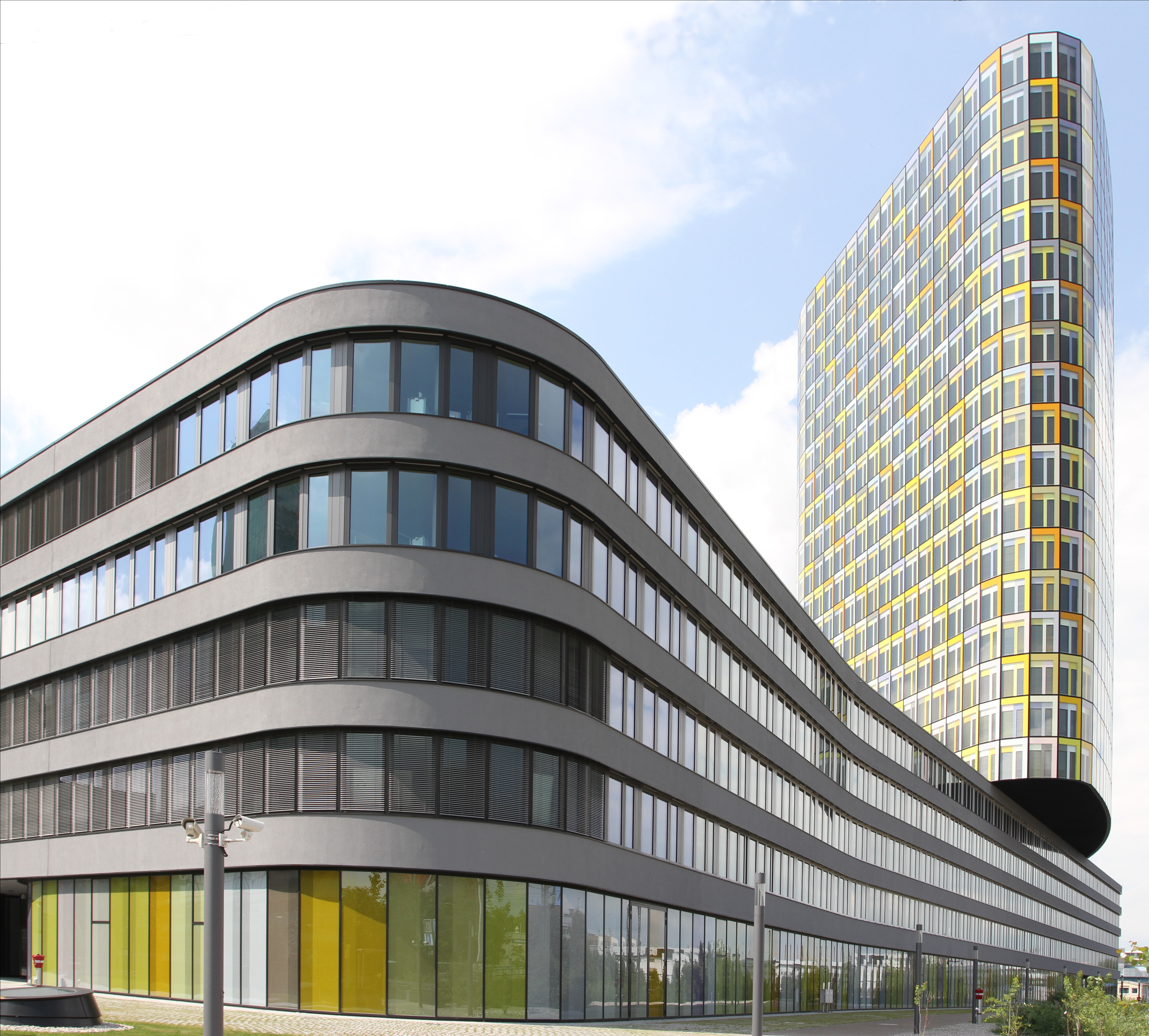
August 2012

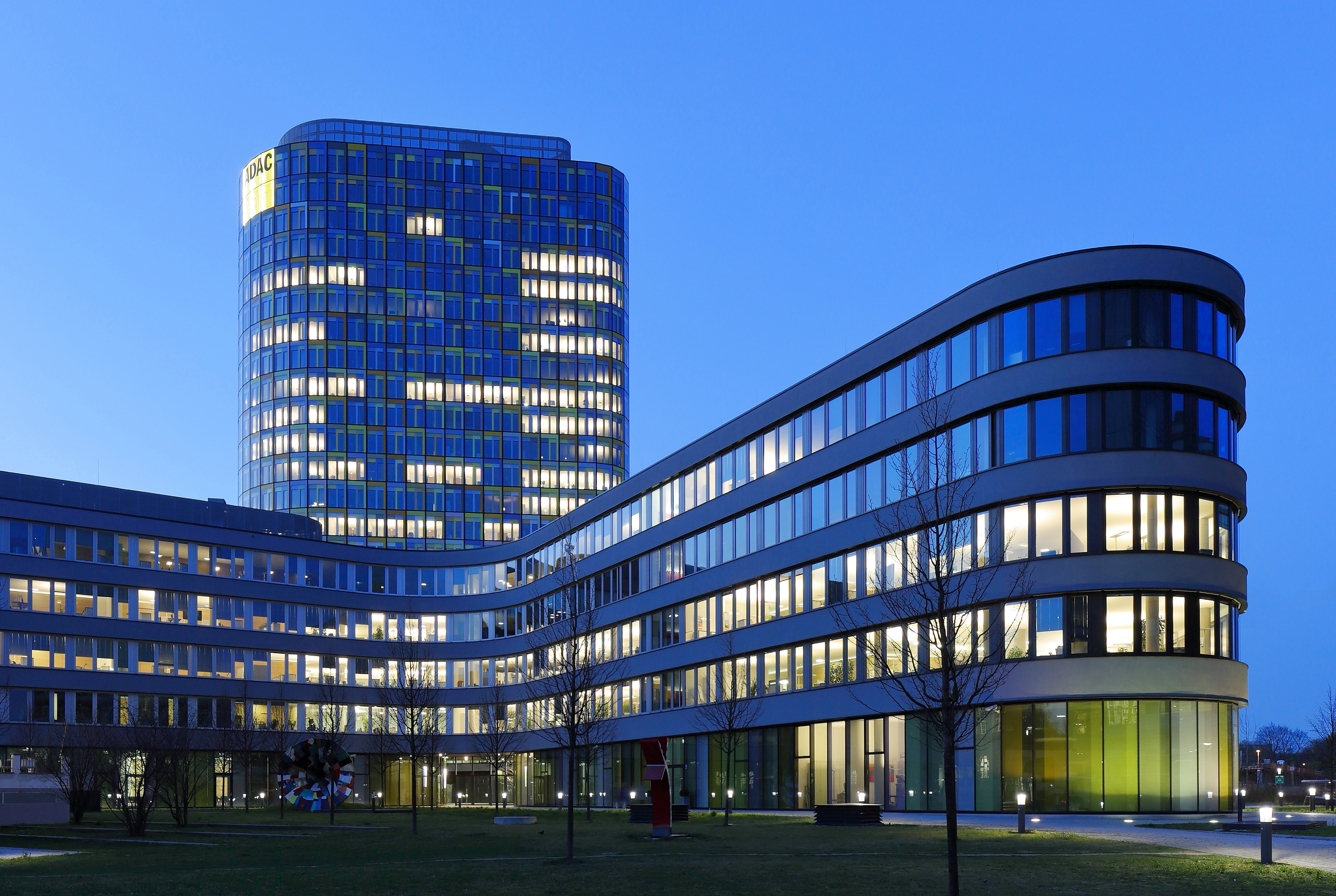
Blaue Stunde, March 2017

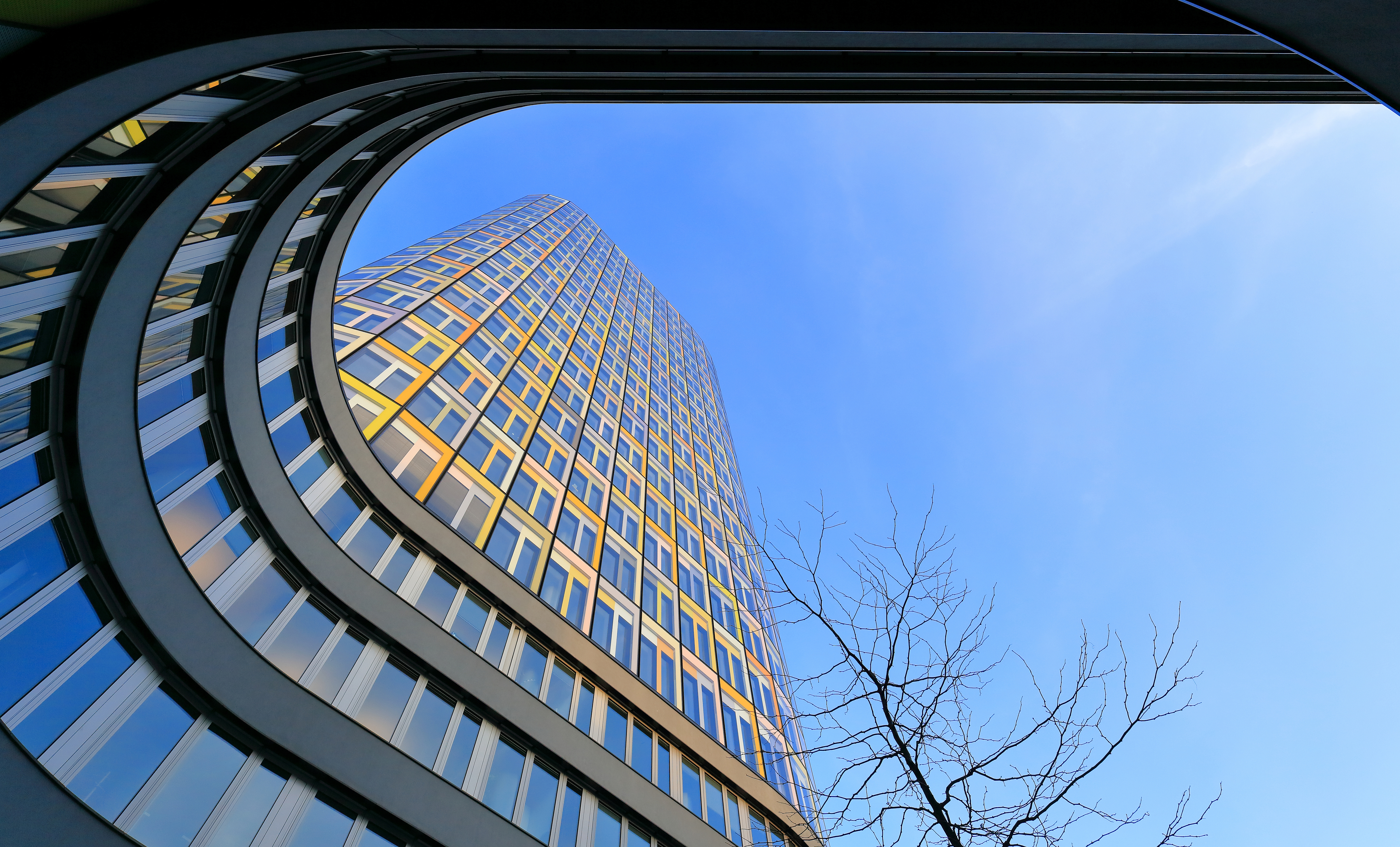
Wurmperspektive, March 2017

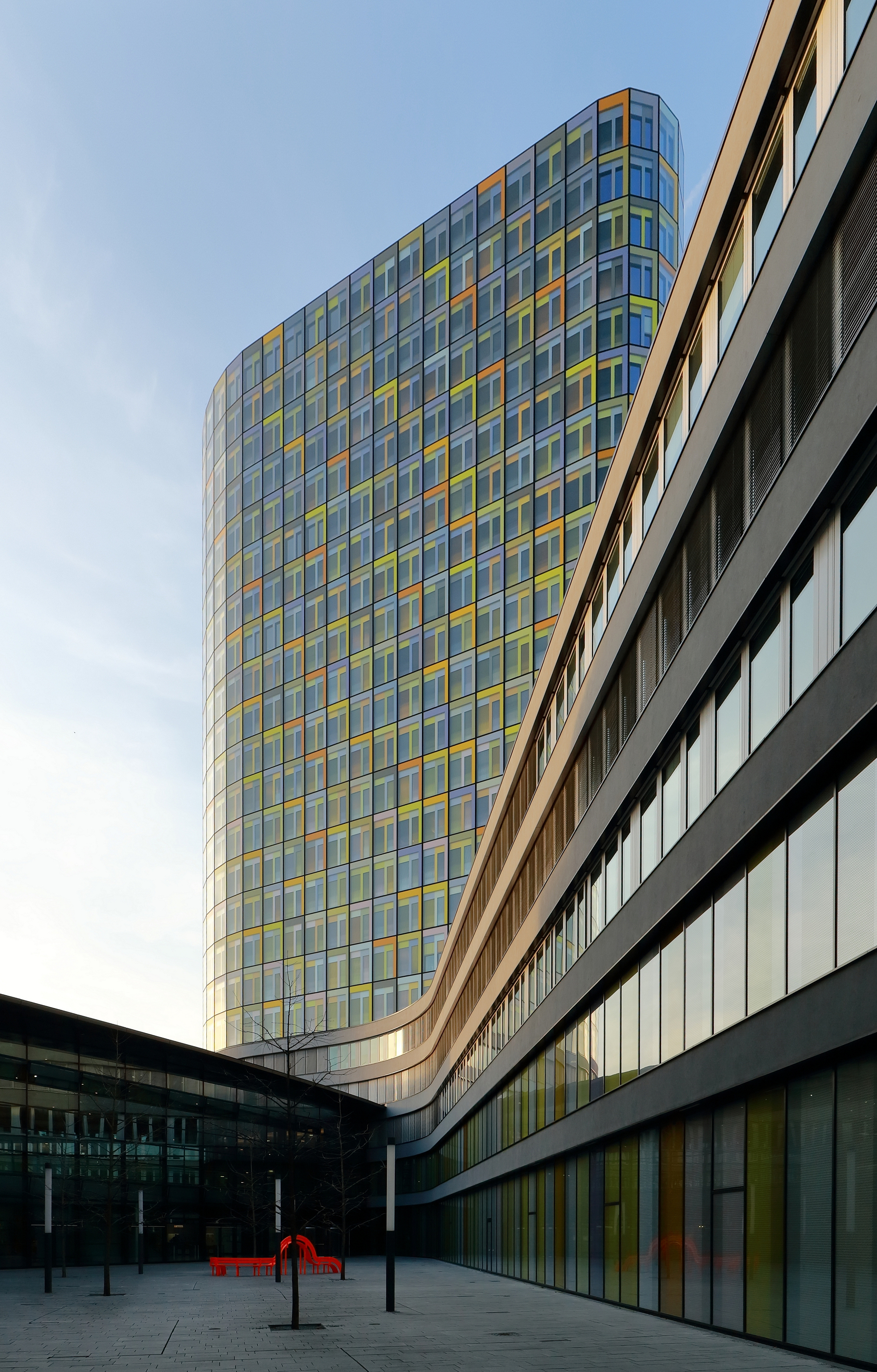
March 2017
