= Arabella Hochhaus =

Arabella-Hochhaus
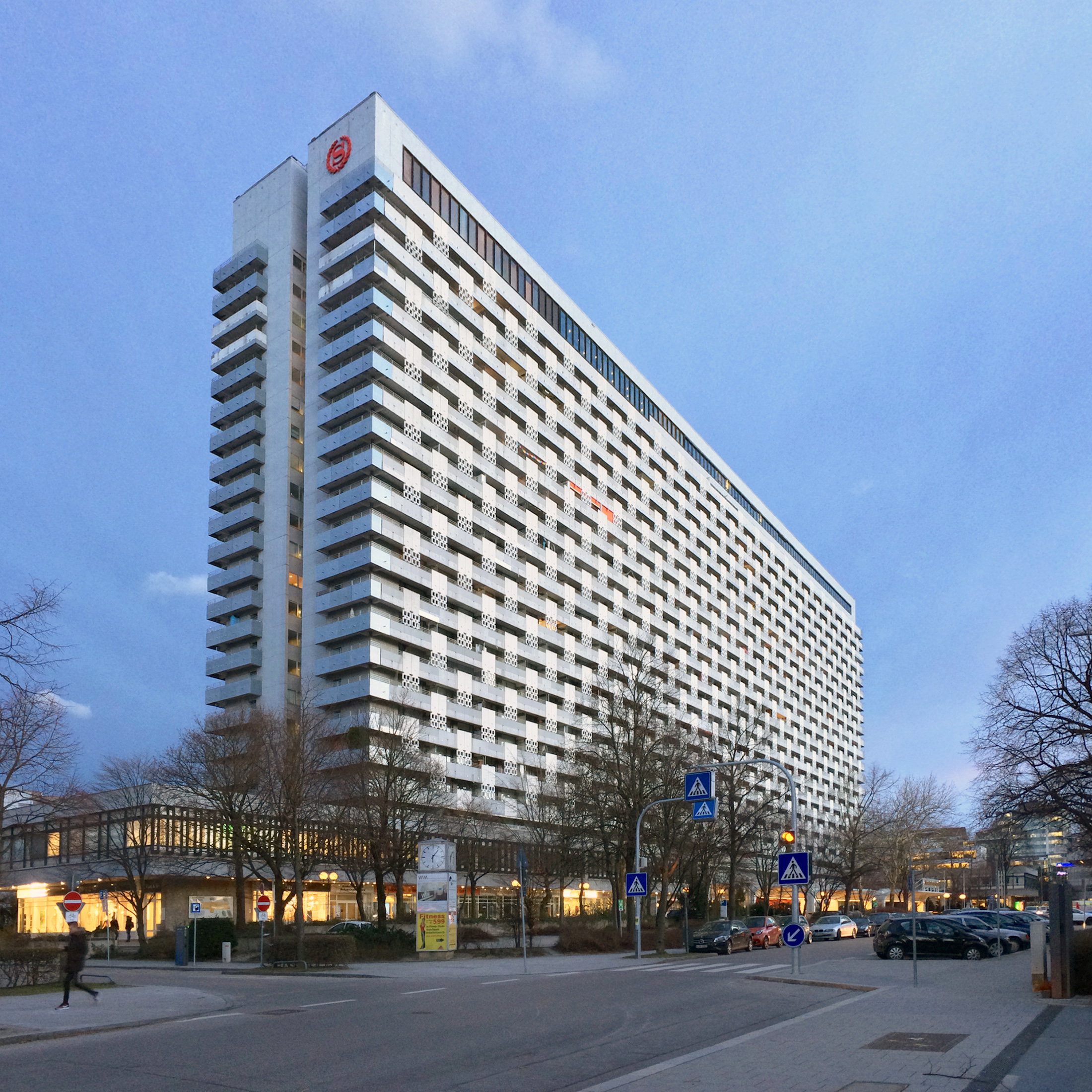
- Interactive map of the Arabella-Hochhaus area
- Alternative names: ArabellaSheraton Bogenhausen Hotel

General information
- Status: Completed
- Type: Hotel/Apartment
- Location: Arabellastraße 5 Munich, Germany
- Coordinates: 48°09′04″N 11°37′06″E
- Construction started: 1966
- Completed: 1969

Height
- Roof: 75 m (246 ft)

Technical details
- Floor count: 23
- Floor area: 89,000 m^{2} (960,000 sq ft)

Design and construction
- Architect: Toby Schmidbauer
- Developer: Josef Schörghuber

Other information
- Number of rooms: 550 apartments/446 hotel rooms

The Arabella-Hochhaus is a 23-storey, 75 m (246 ft), combined hotel, office and apartment building at Arabellapark, in the Bogenhausen neighborhood in eastern Munich, Germany.

== History ==
=== Development ===
The building was designed by architect Toby Schmidbauer and built from 1966 to 1969 by Josef Schörghuber. Until the 1990s, the former Musicland Studios was located in its basement. In order to meet demand for hotel rooms during the 1972 Olympic Games, the building was partly converted into the 467-room Arabella Bogenhausen Hotel, one of the largest hotels in Munich. In 1998, a joint venture was formed between Arabella Hotel Holding and Starwood and the hotel was renamed ArabellaSheraton Bogenhausen. It has since been renamed Sheraton Munich Arabellapark Hotel. The company operates the hotel jointly with The Westin Grand Munich, located across the street. In addition to the hotel, the building is at present home to two clinics, 550 rental apartments, and 100 offices and surgeries. The rooftop features a large spa area.

=== Future ===
The building was originally set for demolition in 2026, as it is at the natural end of its lifespan, ineligible for landmark status, and unsuited to renovation due to its obsolete construction methods. However, the demolition has been postponed to 2030, due to the COVID-19 pandemic, and the hotel will remain open, downgraded to Marriott's Four Points by Sheraton brand in June 2022 as Four Points by Sheraton Munich Arabellapark.

Arabella-Hochhaus is also located in close vicinity to the headquarters of HypoVereinsbank, the also architecturally notable Hypo-Haus.
