= Harriet Alfarata Thompson =

American author (1871–1922)

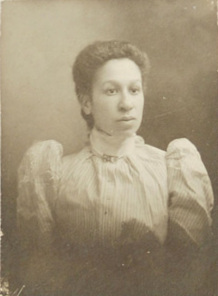
- Born: 1871
- Died: June 9, 1922 (aged 50–51)

Harriet Alfarata Chapman Thompson (1871 – June 9, 1922) was an American author of the utopian novel Idealia: A Utopia Dream; Or, Resthaven (1922).

Harriet Alfarata Chapman was born in Albany, New York, one of five children of African-Americans John R. Chapman and Harriet Alfarata Chapman. She graduated from Albany High School in 1889. Her elder sister Arabella was the first African-American to graduate from that school in 1877.

After attending Albany Business College, she worked for Melvil Dewey at the New York State Library, retiring in August 1921 as head stenographer of the catalogue department. She married John W. Thompson in September 1921. She died on June 9, 1922, while visiting her brother in Cambridge, Massachusetts.

Her husband posthumously published her novel Idealia in 1922. The short novel describes a humane Utopian community for the elderly, orphans, and disabled.
