= Highlight Towers =

Twin tower office skyscraper complex completed in 2004 in Munich, Germany

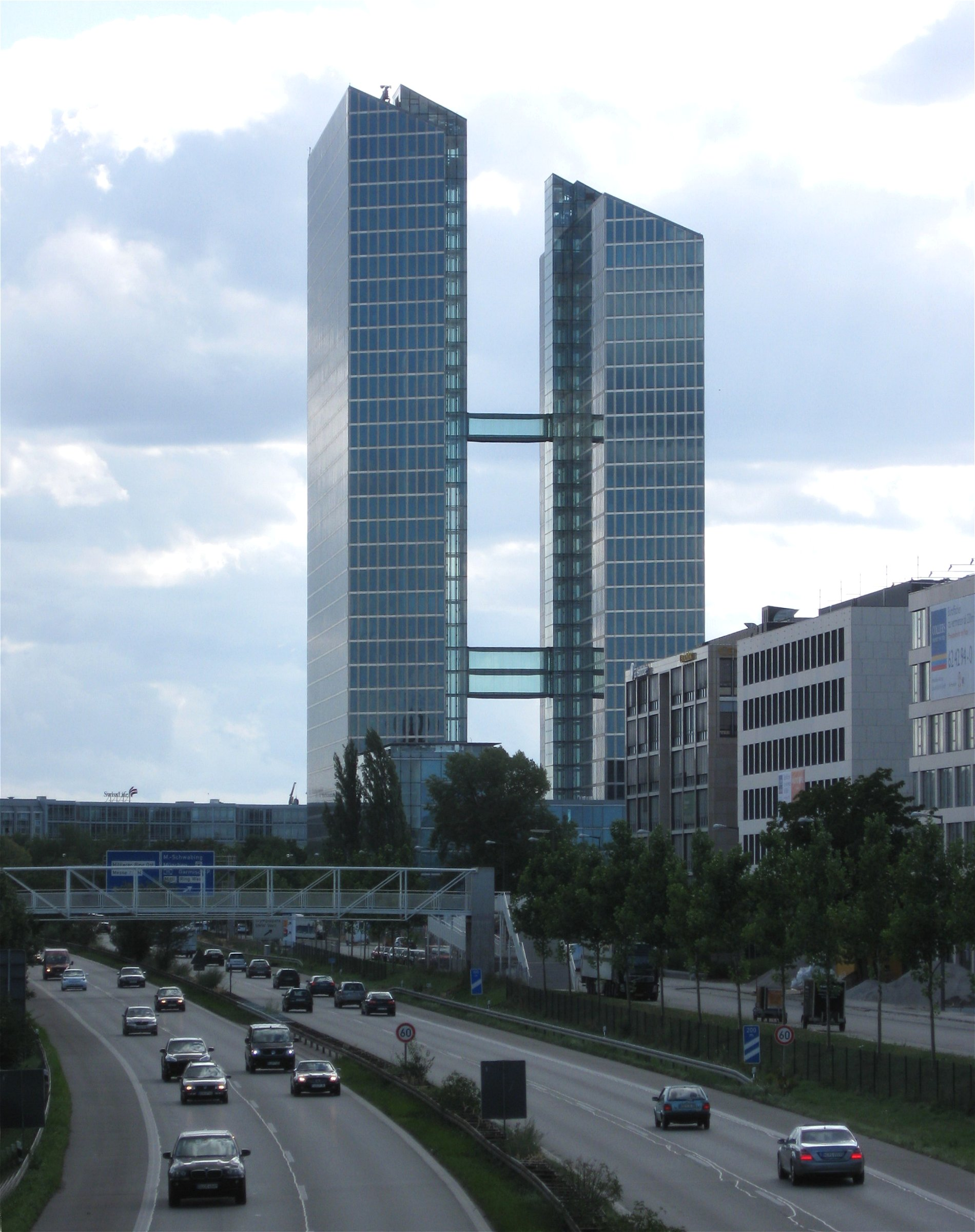
- Interactive map of the Highlight Towers area
- Alternative names: Langenscheidt-Hochhäuser

General information
- Status: Completed
- Type: Commercial offices
- Architectural style: Modernism
- Location: Mies-van-der-Rohe-Straße; Munich, Germany
- Coordinates: 48°10′36″N 11°35′32″E
- Completed: 2002 - 2004

Height
- Roof: Tower I: 126 m (413 ft); Tower II: 113 m (371 ft)

Technical details
- Floor count: Tower I: 33; Tower II: 28
- Floor area: 73,836 m^{2} (794,760 sq ft)

Design and construction
- Architect: Murphy Jahn
- Structural engineer: stahl + verbundbau
- Main contractor: Strabag Bau-AG

Highlight Towers is a twin tower office skyscraper complex completed in 2004 in Munich, Germany, planned by architects Murphy/Jahn of Chicago. Tower I is 126 m (413 ft) tall with 33 storeys, and Tower II is 113 m (371 ft) tall with 28 storeys, which make them among the highest buildings in the city. The towers are joined by two skyways made of glass and steel. Also in the complex are two low-rise buildings between the twin towers, that serve as a hotel and additional office space. Overall, the facility offers approximately 73,836 m^{2} (794,760 sq ft) of office space.

The towers are slightly shifted in the historic sightline of Odeonsplatz on Ludwigstraße with Victory Gate to the north and form a focal point for visitors coming from the north of the city.

== Tenants ==
The best known tenants of the buildings are the IT and consulting firms Unify and Fujitsu Technology Solutions, as well as IBM.

== Controversy ==
With construction works finished in the same year as Hochhaus Uptown München, the two towers helped motivate the formation of a citizens' initiative aimed at preventing the development of further structures of this type and size. Leading architects criticized the buildings as "imported imitation architecture" and "faceless yard ware", while local residents expressed concerns related to the skyscrapers destroying the traditional cityscape.

== Gallery ==
Highlight Towers
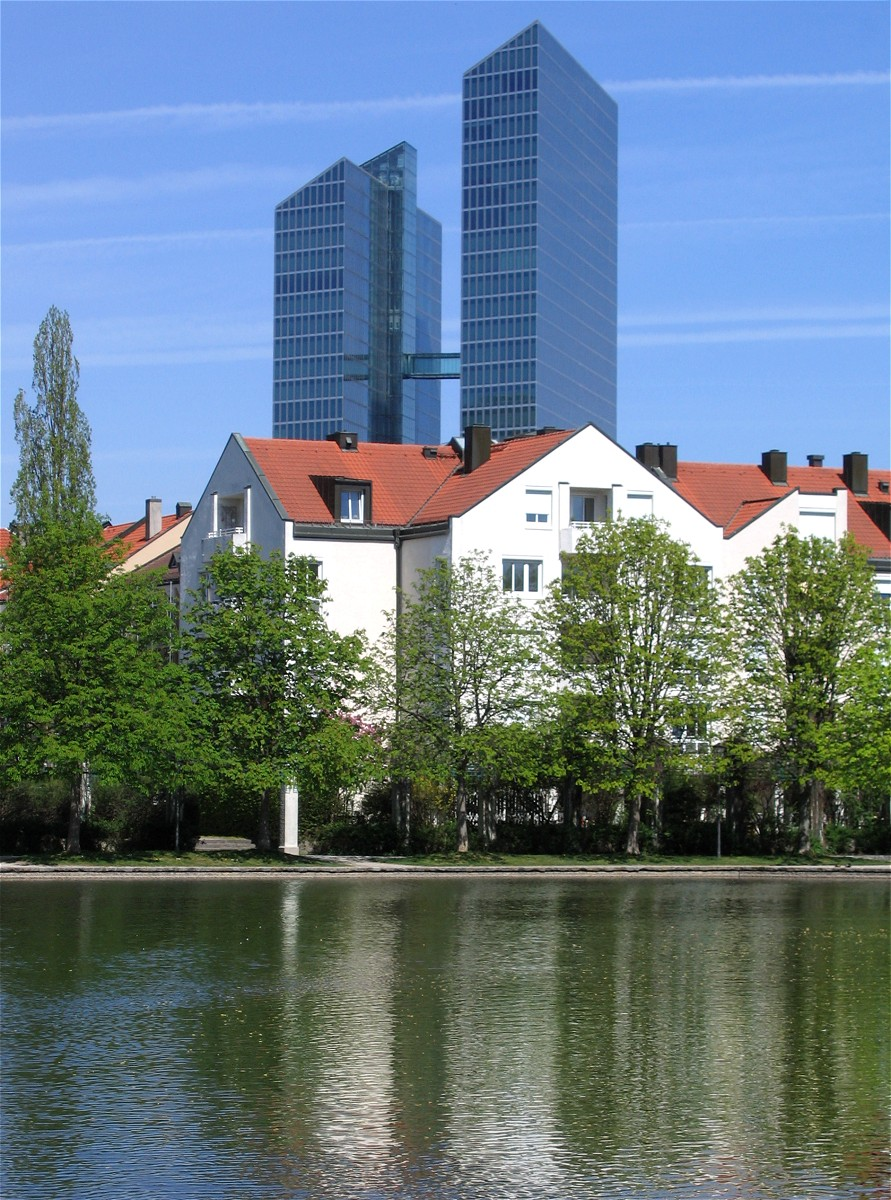

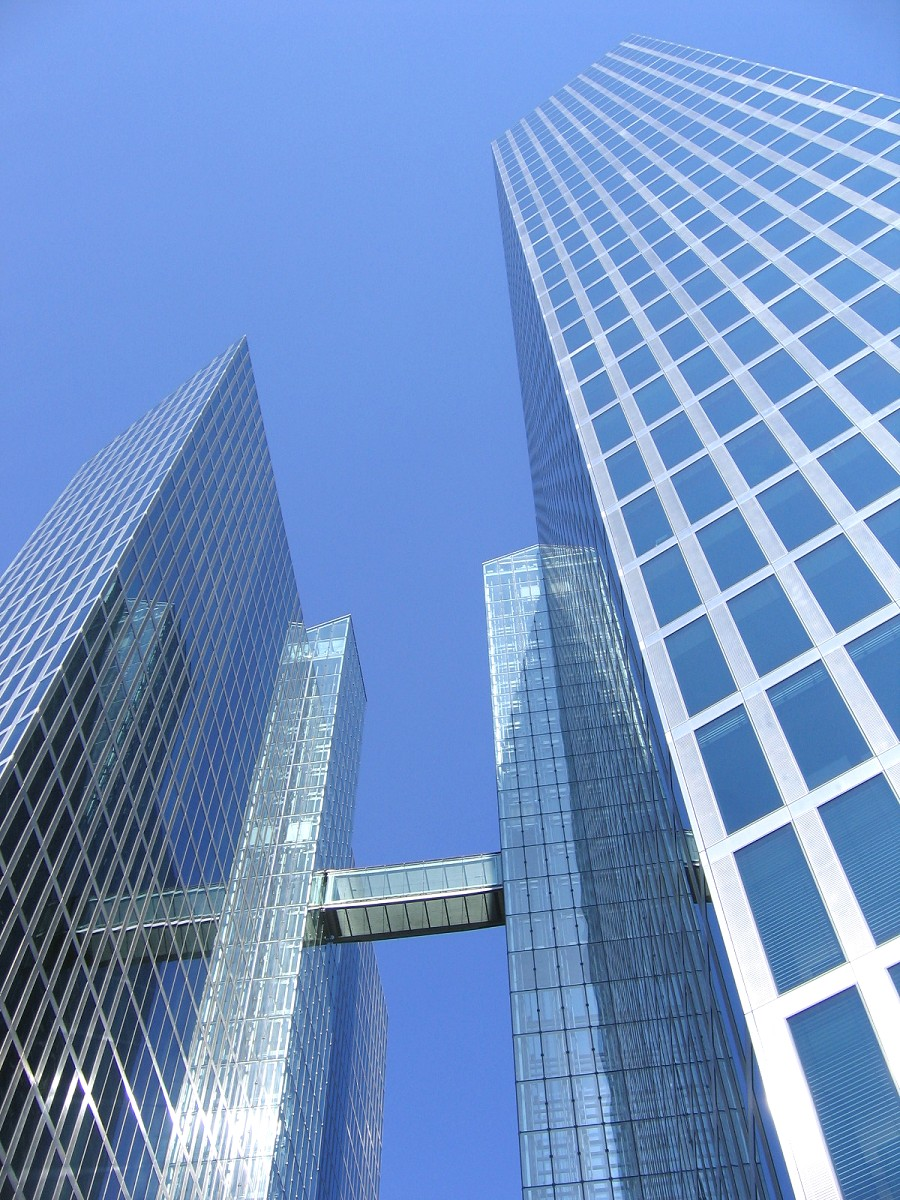

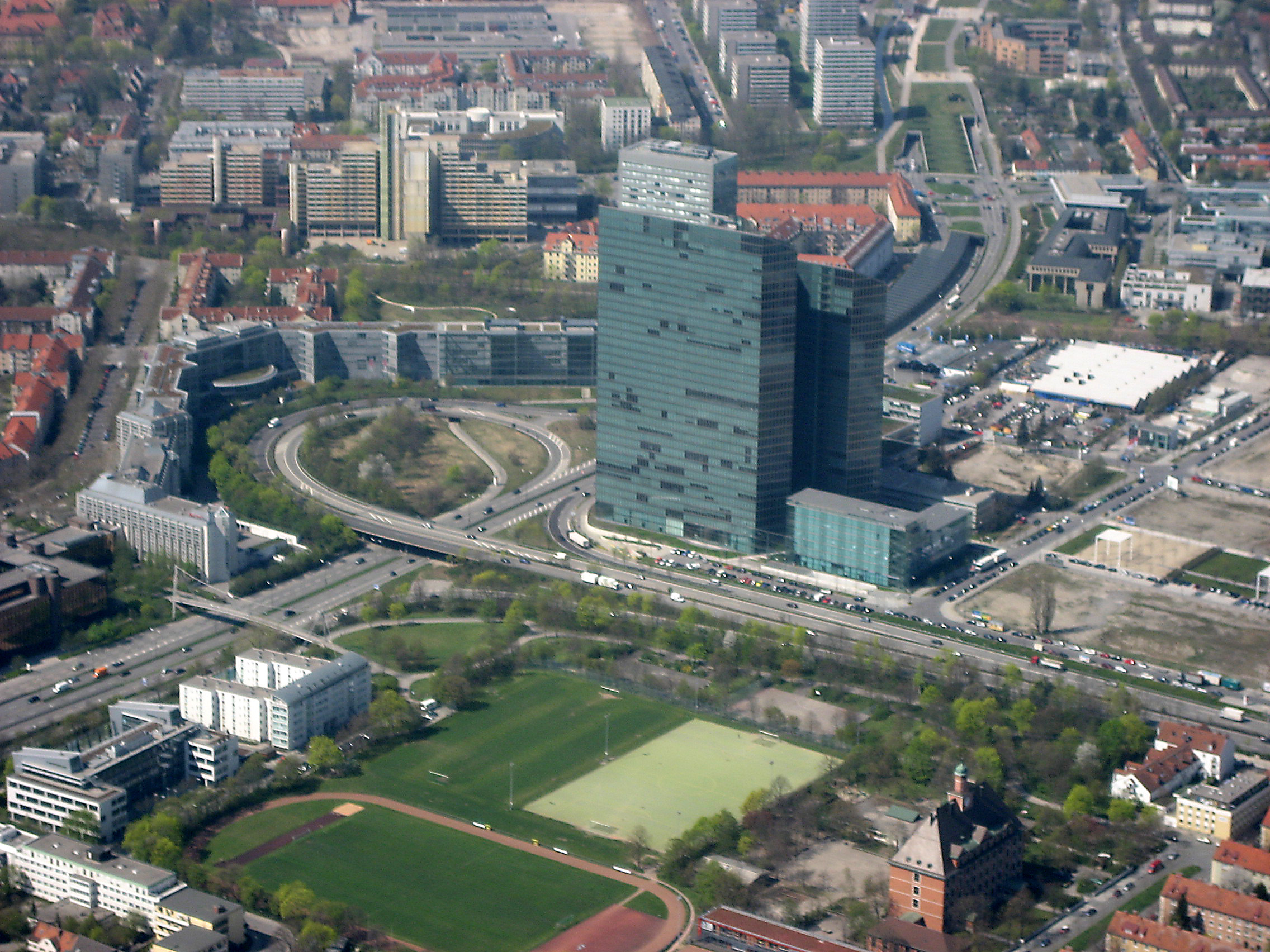

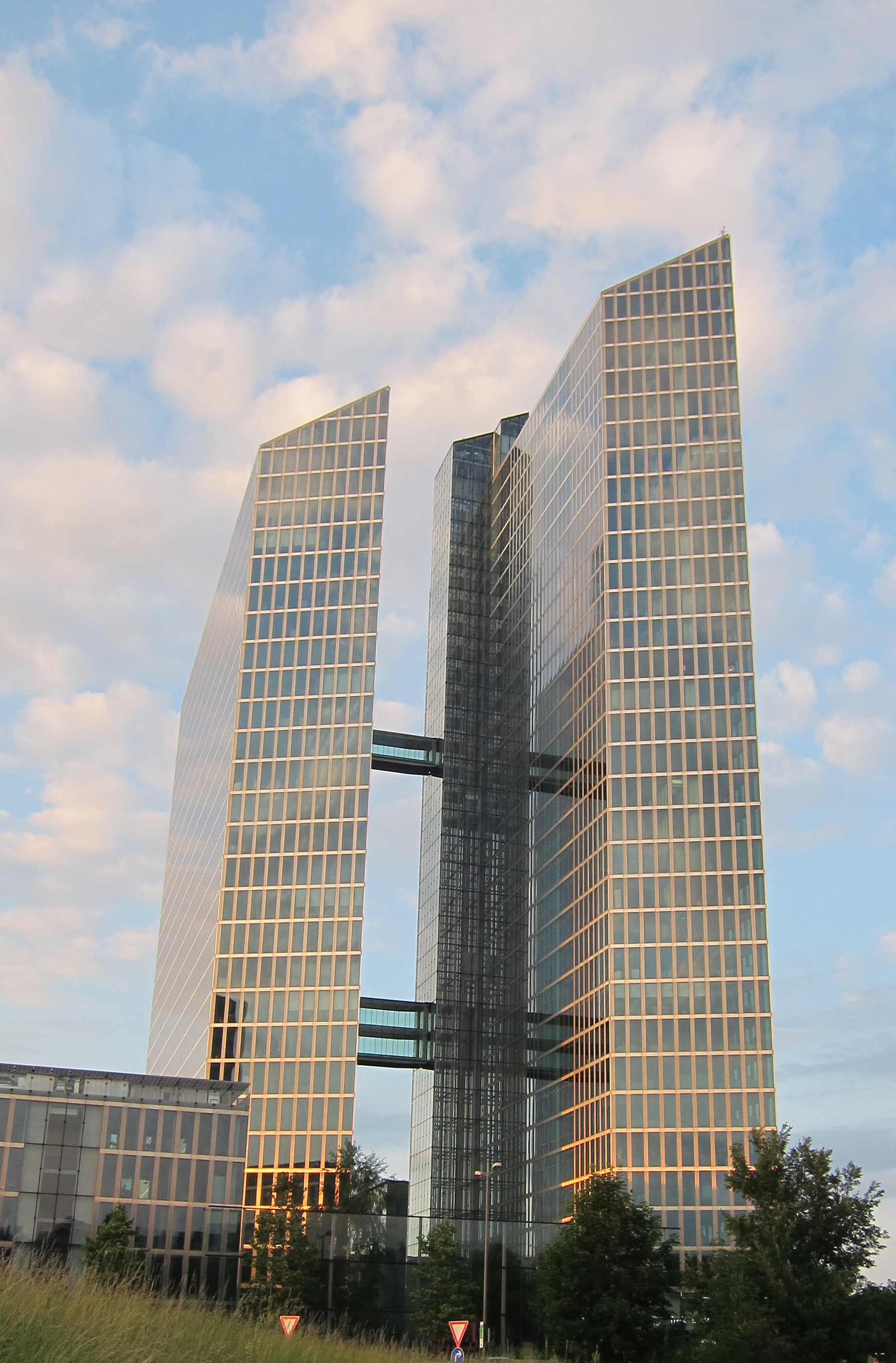

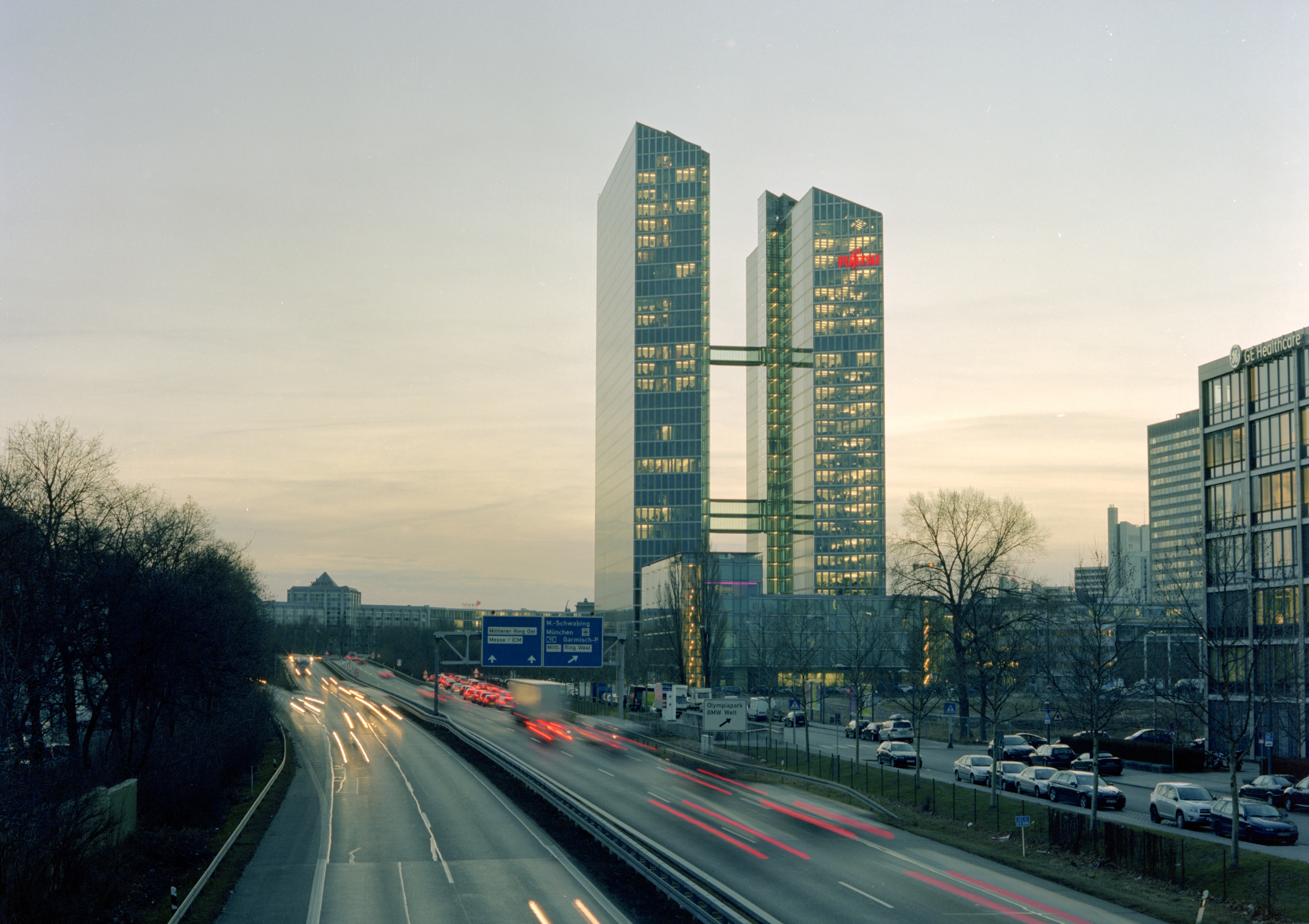

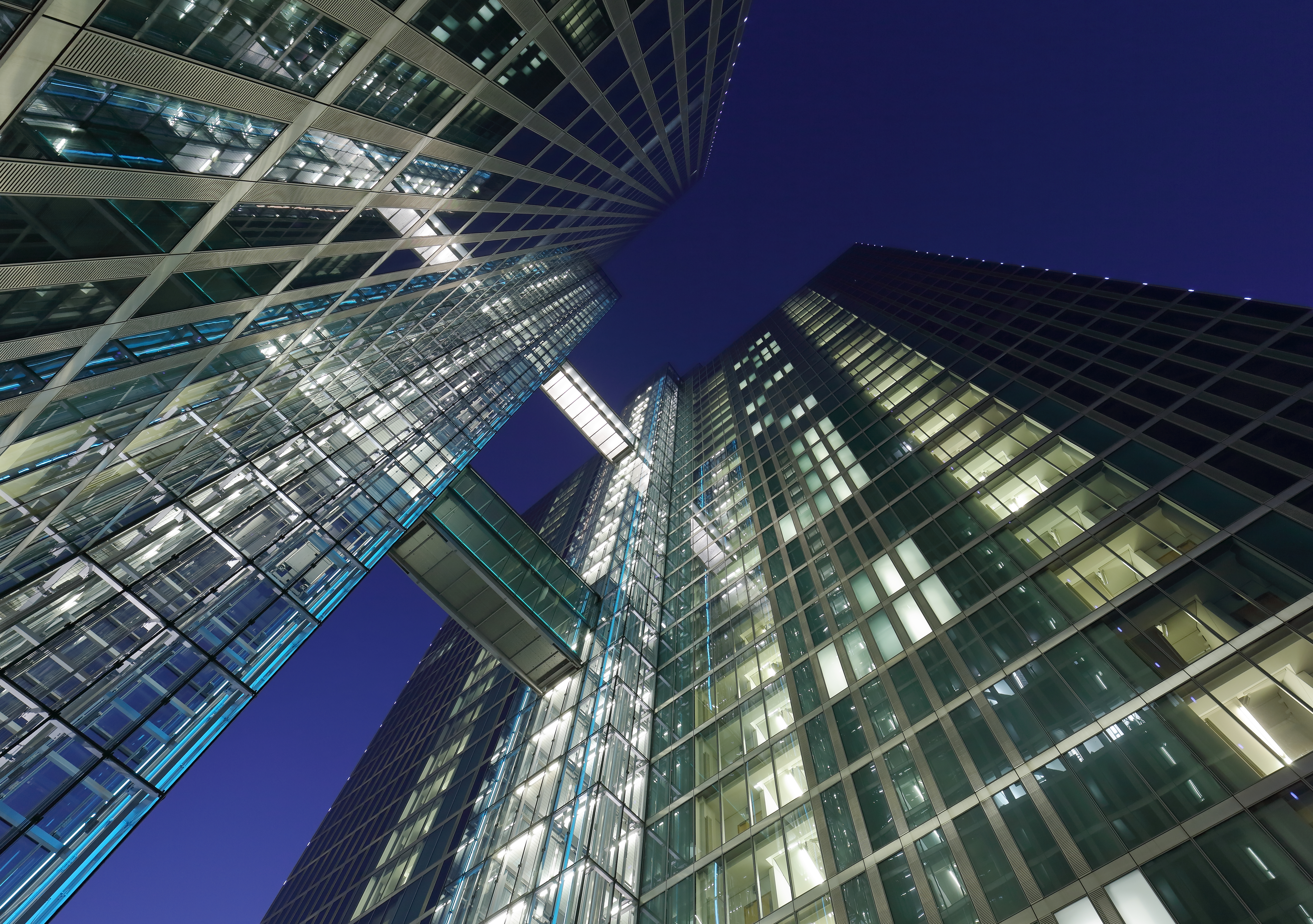
