= Arabela =

Arabela may refer to:

- Arabela language, native to Peru
- Arabela (beetle), a genus of insects in the tribe Hemilophini
- Arabela (TV series), Czech children's television series (1979-81)
- Arabela, New Mexico, an unincorporated community in New Mexico, United States
- Greco-Roman name for the Iraqi-Kurdistan capital city of Erbil

== See also ==
- Arabella (disambiguation)
- Arbela (disambiguation)
