= Arbela =

Arbela may refer to:

== Astronomy ==
- Arbela Sulcus, a grooved terrain on Jupiter's moon Ganymede.

== Places ==
- Greco-Roman name of the city of Erbil, Kurdistan Region, Iraq
- Arbel, Israel
- Irbid, Jordan
- Arbela, Ohio, United States
- Arbela Township, Michigan, United States
- Arbela, Missouri, United States

== Other uses ==
- Arbela (bug), a genus of insect
- Battle of Arbela, fought in 331 BC near modern Erbil, Iraq
- Chronicle of Arbela, a religious text

== See also ==
- Arabela (disambiguation)
