= Hypo-Haus =

High-rise administrative building of the HypoVereinsbank in Munich

HVB Tower
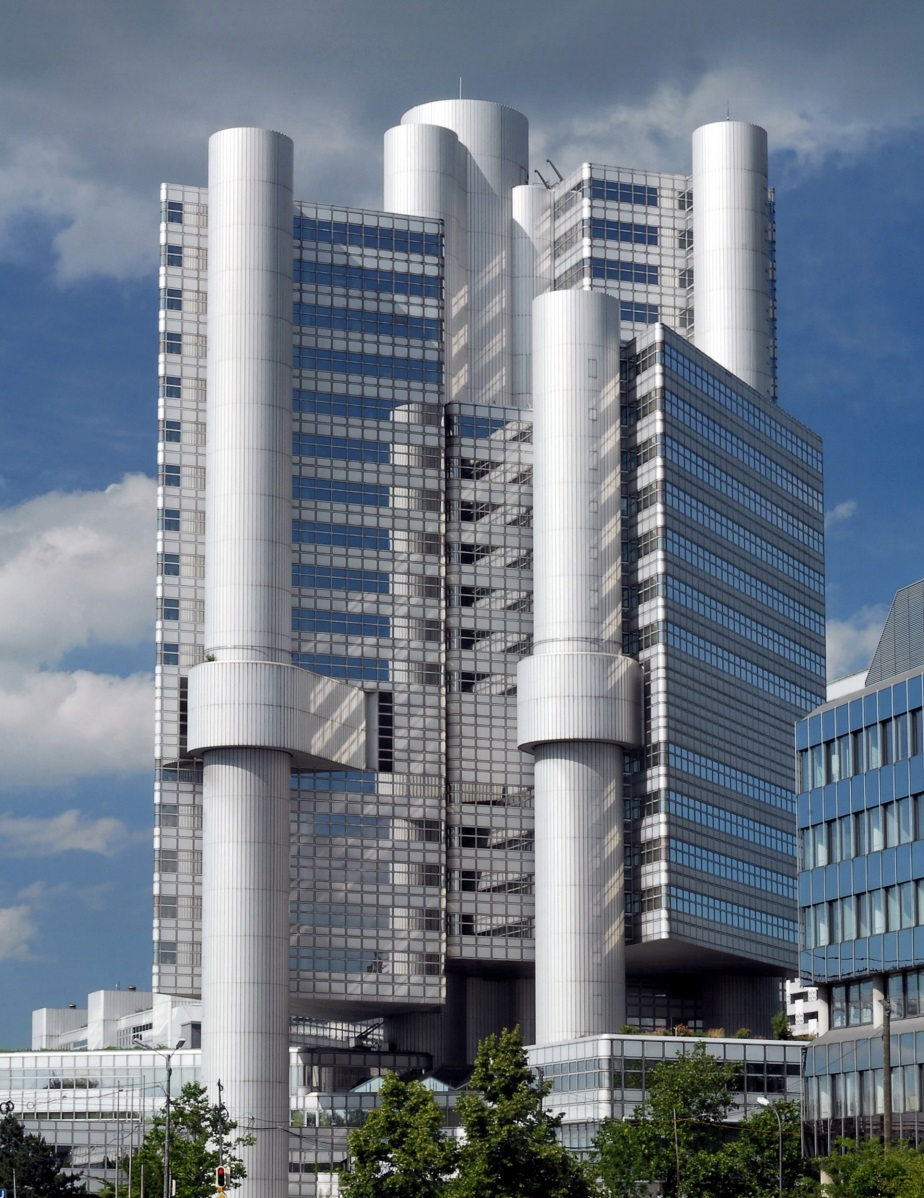
- Interactive map of the HVB Tower area

General information
- Type: Commercial offices
- Location: Munich, Germany
- Coordinates: 48°08′59″N 11°37′02″E
- Construction started: 1975
- Completed: 1981
- Inaugurated: November 16, 1981; 44 years ago
- Renovated: 2013-2015
- Owner: HVZ GmbH & Co. Objekt KG

Height
- Architectural: 113.7 m (373 ft)

Technical details
- Floor count: 27 (+4 underground floors)
- Floor area: 140,000 m^{2} (1,507,000 sq ft)
- Lifts/elevators: 8

Design and construction
- Architects: Walther and Bea Betz

The listed HVB Tower or formerly Hypo-house (Hypo-Haus) or Hypo high-rise building (Hypo-Hochhaus) is an administrative building of the HypoVereinsbank in Munich.

== Architecture and history ==
In 1960 there were the first thoughts to centralize the headquarters of Hypobank, which was located to twelve different locations at that time. In 1970, concrete planning for the construction of the hypo-house at the Arabellapark started in cooperation with the architectural firm Betz. The construction preparations began in September 1974 with the excavation. For the low-rise buildings and the pillars of the tower, construction work began in April 1975. In November 1978, the new offices were occupied in the low-rise buildings. The skyscraper was completed in 1981 and opened officially on 16 November 1981. Today it is part of the administrative center of HypoVereinsbank at the Arabella Park. The ensemble also includes two low-rise buildings (North and South) and the later built "Hypo-House East".The building is located at the Richard-Strauss-Straße, corner Denninger Straße, right on the arterial road "Mittlerer Ring" (district Bogenhausen, subway station Richard-Strauss-Straße on line U4). It is 113.7 meters (374 feet) high and was designed and planned by architect couple Walther and Bea Betz. The static calculations were very complicated due to the unusual architecture and included 100,000 pages. The builder-owner was "Hypo-Bank Verwaltungszentrum GmbH & Co. KG". Held & Francke Bauaktiengesellschaft were the general contractor. HVB Tower was the first building in Munich with a height of about 100 meters (328 feet).The complex consists of a tower with 27 floors above ground, four underground floors and two low-rise buildings associated with the tower. The net floor area (NFA) is 100,000 m² (1,076,391 square feet) gross floor area of approximately 140,000 m² (1,506,947 square feet). As an architectural feature five floors are hanging in the Tower (5th-9th floor), which are suspended from a central support frame. Since 2006, the HVB Tower is a listed building. Until the completion of Uptown Munich in 2004, the 27-storey Hypo-Haus was Munich's tallest office building.

== Utilization ==
HVB Tower is a central administrative building of the HypoVereinsbank with offices, conference area, trading floor, computer center and canteen (about 3,000 workplaces). As part of the renovation, a modern office space concept is introduced (Smart Working) at HVB Tower. In addition, the HVB Tower will be the company's headquarters and domicile of the management board Board of HypoVereinsbank in the future.

== Energy renovation ==
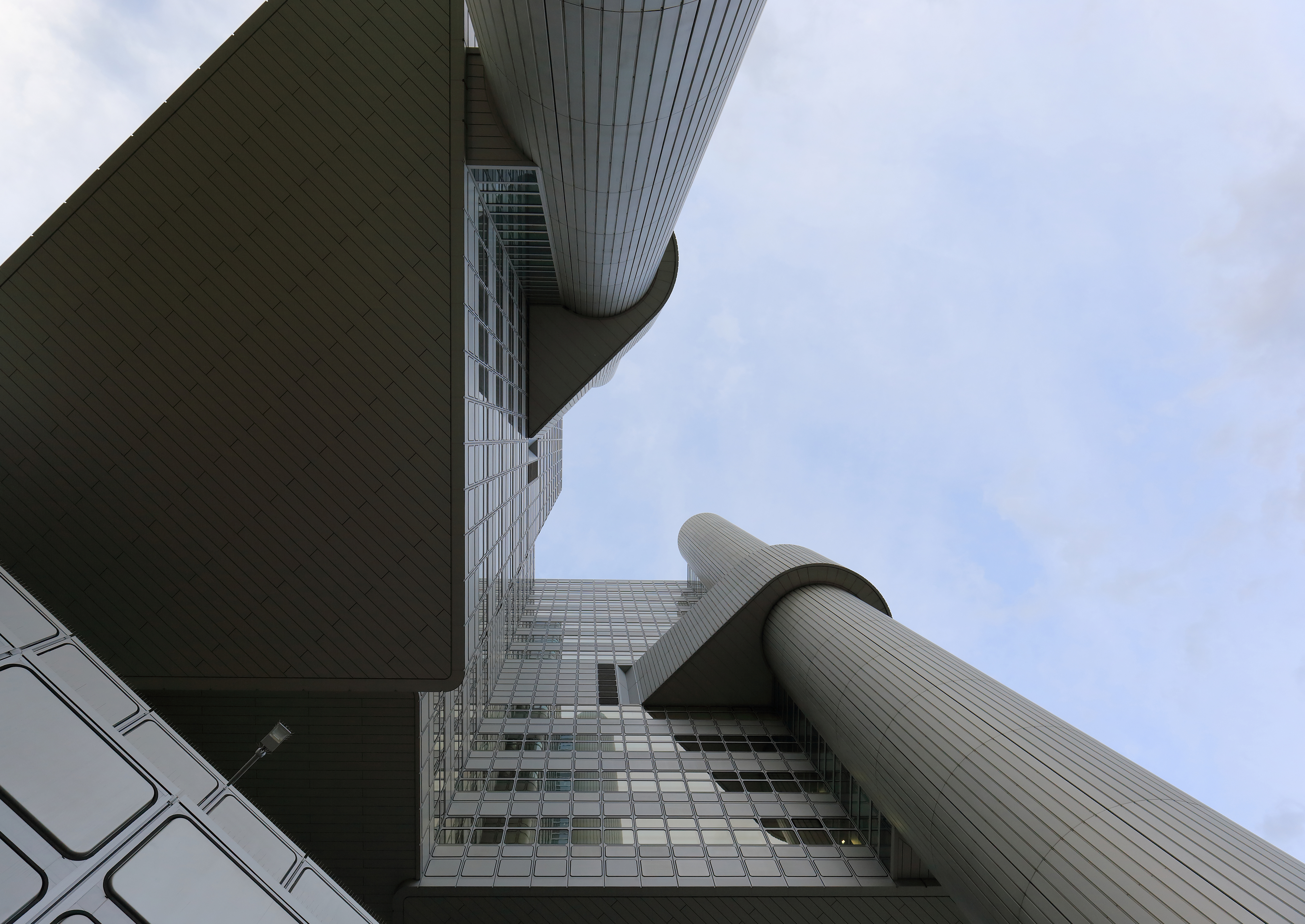
Worm's-eye view

In March 2011, HypoVereinsbank (UniCredit Bank AG) announced that the HVB Tower will be redeveloped the coming years (until approx. 2015) and so should be converted to a "green building" according to LEED. Construction works began during the year 2013. Important components of the energy-efficient renovation is the renewal of the entire facade while maintaining the outer listed appearance. In addition, the building will be completely renovated, building fire protection will be adapted for today's standards, and use of geothermal energy and rainwater will be implemented.

=== Renewal of facade ===
The existing two-pane insulating glass facade is replaced by a box-window facade with four layers of glass, which is state of the art. Glazed external hard disks (one layer of glass) with defined vents allow air exchange with the outside air by opening the internal three-pane casement windows. The coating of the glass allows optimal use of daylight while minimizing solar heat input. Thus cooling loads in summer and in winter the heating energy demand can be reduced. A computer-controlled sun protection in the box window is responsive to both the changing position of the sun as well as to the individual needs of users, it is integrated into the control of the technical equipment. Waste heat generated by solar radiation is dissipated in the box on the window vents to the outside and relieves the building cooling.

=== Building technology ===
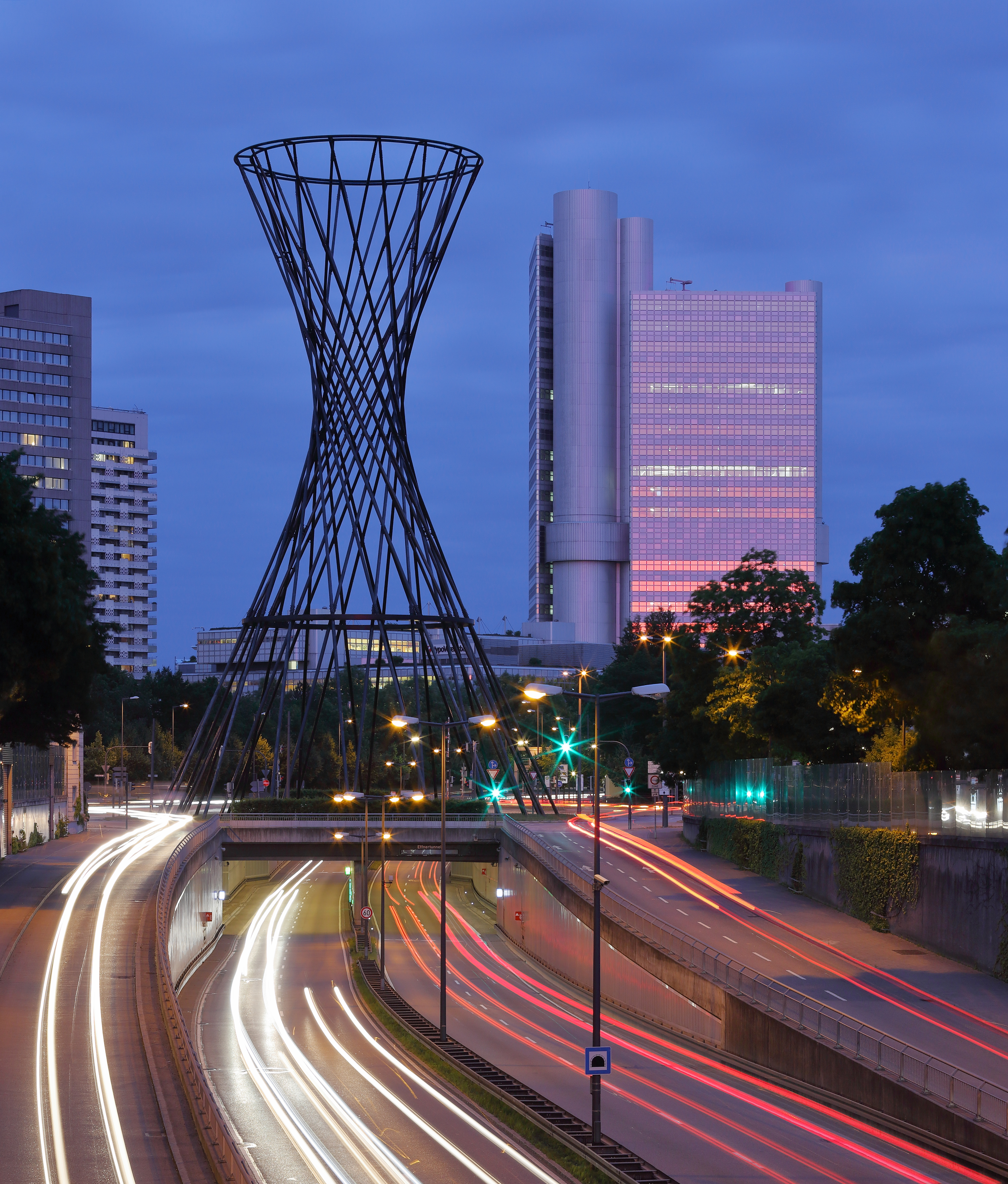
HVB Tower and "Mae West" at dusk

The outdated and energy-intensive technical building equipment and building technology will be replaced. New heating and cooling systems increase operational efficiency and improve comfort for building occupants. The new building technology is closely coordinated with the new facade as "climate skin".

=== Updating fire safety concept ===
The creation of a new fire protection plan provides an optimization of the escape ways and fire extinguishing. Among other things, a staircase-pressure ventilation, and a highly efficient smoke removal is realized in the Tower.

=== Rainwater usage ===
By installing rainwater tanks, water consumption can be reduced. The watering of the plants will be supplied from this reservoir.

=== Geothermal energy ===
The installation of a fountain cooling enables the use of groundwater as a source of energy and can be realized through the heat exchange principle to reduce the energy consumption for cooling in summer and heating in winter.

Redevelopment of the northern low-rise building was planned to be undertaken from 2016.

== In popular culture ==
A photograph of this skyscraper can be seen at the inner sleeve of the album Time by Electric Light Orchestra. It also serves as the cover art for Frodus' album Conglomerate International.
