= Arabella Chapman =

- Arabella Chapman Miller
- Born: 1859; Jersey City, New Jersey
- Died: 1927 (aged 67–68); Albany, New York
- Other name: Arabella Chapman Miller

Arabella Chapman (1859–1927) was an African American woman who is best remembered for being the first student to graduate from upstate New York's Albany School for Educating People of Color, later known as Albany High School.

== Biography ==
Chapman was born free in Jersey City, New Jersey. Her father was John Chapman, a boatman, and her mother was Harriet Alfarata. Her sister was Harriet Alfarata Thompson. By 1870, her family had moved to Albany, New York, which had a thriving African American community. She first attended Wilberforce School, before going on to Albany Free Academy (now Albany High School). In 1877, she became the first African American to graduate from the Free Academy, and by 1880, she was teaching music. Her marriage to Clarence Miller led Chapman to leave Albany, traveling with Miller to North Adams, Massachusetts, where he would be employed as a waiter and she would raise their children.

Chapman created two photographic albums in the 1870s and 1880s. These albums survive in the collection of the University of Michigan's William L. Clements Library. They are rare items that document Chapman's personal and political vision. The photographic portraits included those of notable figures such as Abraham Lincoln, Frederick Douglass, and John Brown, as well as Chapman herself, along with her family and friends.

Chapman's photo albums were exhibited in the 2013–14 exhibition, Proclaiming Emancipation, at the University of Michigan as examples of how the memory of the Civil War, Emancipation, and citizenship was constructed by ordinary people.

Arabella Chapman's photo albums have been curated as part of an on-line exhibit, The Arabella Chapman Project.
