= Arabella Station =

- U.S. National Register of Historic Places
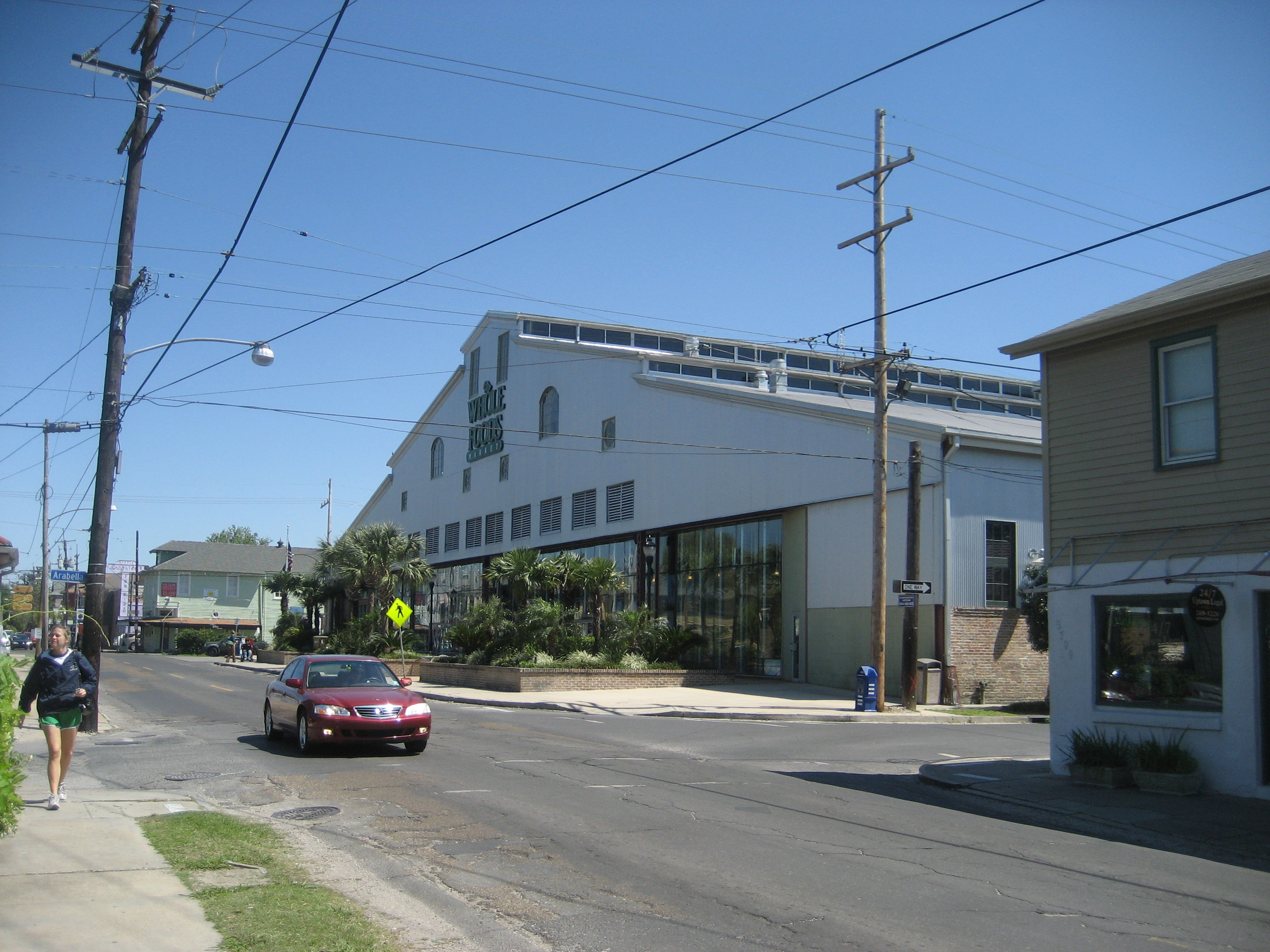
- New Orleans: The Arabella Station building seen from Magazine Street. It now houses a "Whole Foods Market" store.

- Location within East New Orleans Location within Louisiana Location within the United States
- Location: 5600 Magazine St., New Orleans, Louisiana
- Coordinates: 29°55′14″N 90°07′03″W
- Area: 1.7 acres (0.69 ha)
- Built: 1893
- Built by: Youngstown Bridge Co.
- Architect: Brown, Linus W.
- NRHP reference No.: 95001484
- Added to NRHP: January 4, 1996

Arabella Station, is a historic building on Magazine Street in New Orleans, Louisiana. It was added to the National Register of Historic Places on January 4, 1996. It is now a Whole Foods for Uptown New Orleans.

It has also been known as Arabella Carbarn and as Upper Magazine Station/Carbarn. It was a carbarn for storage and parking of streetcars. It was designed by New Orleans city engineer Linus W. Brown. It was built by the Youngstown Bridge Co.

The building now houses a Whole Foods Market, which opened in December 2002, and off-street parking for the market.
