= Arabella (1917 film) =

1917 film

Arabella is a Polish silent film melodrama from 1917, one of Pola Negri's last films in her Polish homeland before she moved to Germany at the beginning of the same year.

== Plot ==
At the center of the plot is the femme fatale Arabella Pataniecka, who has men lying at her feet. One of them is the rich Stanislaw Pobratymski, who becomes engaged to her. But he has a strong opponent in Olgier Podhorski, a relative who also loves Arabella and wants to get rid of his annoying rival as quickly as possible. Therefore, he gets Dr. East a poisonous plant for Stanislaw. When he can be saved at the last second, Olgier shoots himself.

== Production notes ==
The 70-minute film was made in the middle of World War I in Warsaw, which was under German military rule. Arabella had its premiere there on May 1, 1917. Today it is considered lost, apart from a few meters of film. Arabella arrived in Austria-Hungary on November 2, 1917. The film was four acts over 1,500 meters long and was banned from schools. It was shown in Germany the following year, during the war. Banned for young people her too, the film was five acts over a length of 1,427 meters.

The melodrama can be seen as typical of Pola Negri's early silent films; she would later play the role type shown there, the "man-murdering vamp", again and again.

Director Aleksander Hertz (1879–1928) is one of Poland's almost forgotten filmmakers today. He is of paramount importance when it comes to Poland's film history: Even during Tsarist rule, he owned the most important production company in Warsaw, the Sfinks, and directed or produced a number of films that were very successful at the time, including several with Pola Negri, such as Bestia.

== Reviews ==
“The four-act drama is characterized by a captivating plot, which is gaining interest because of the criminal element.” – New Kino-Rundschau Paimann's film lists said: “The material, acting, photos and scenery are very good.”
