= New St. John's Church, Munich =

Roman Catholic church in Germany

Coordinates: 48°08′02″N 11°35′52″E

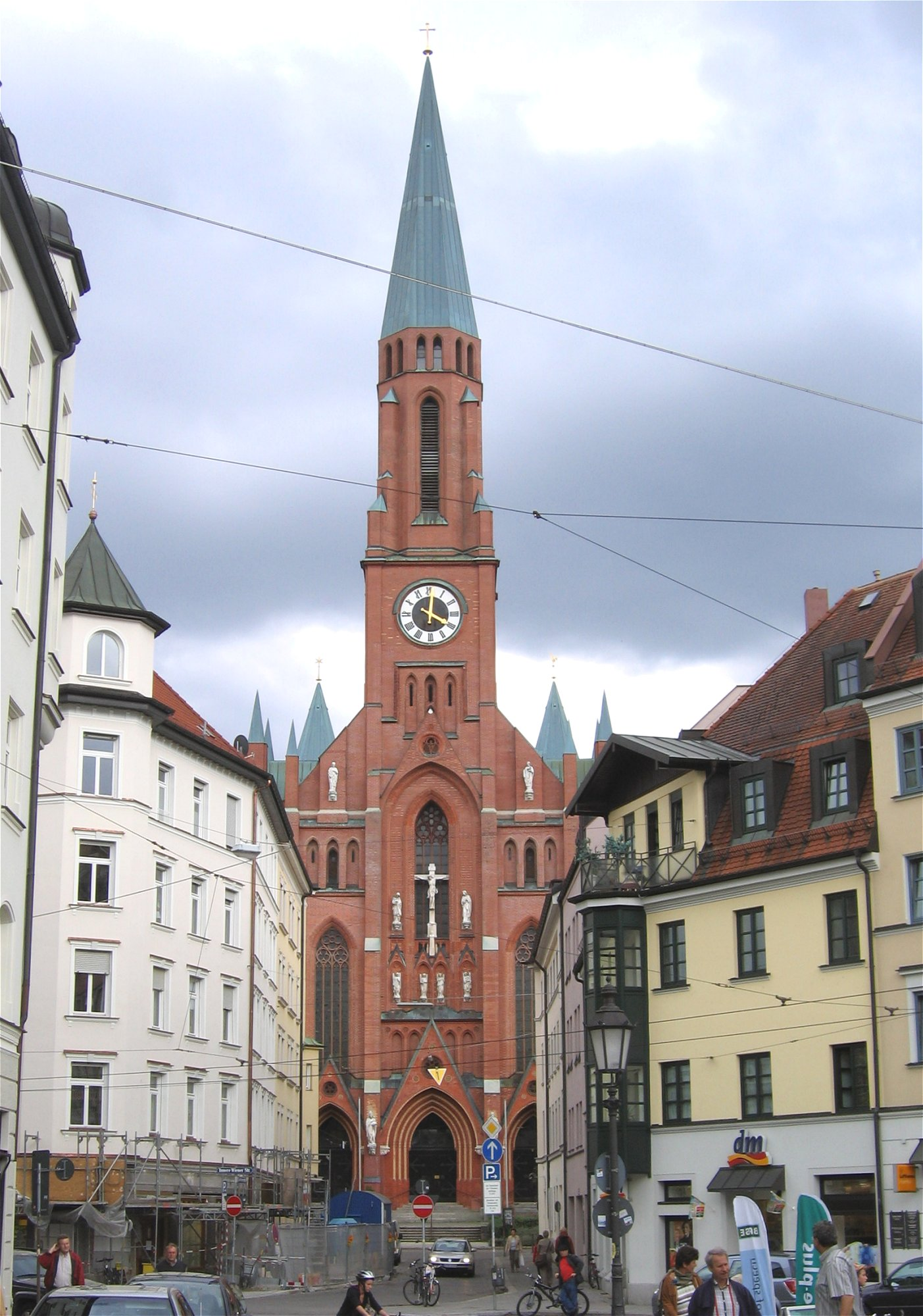
St. John's Church

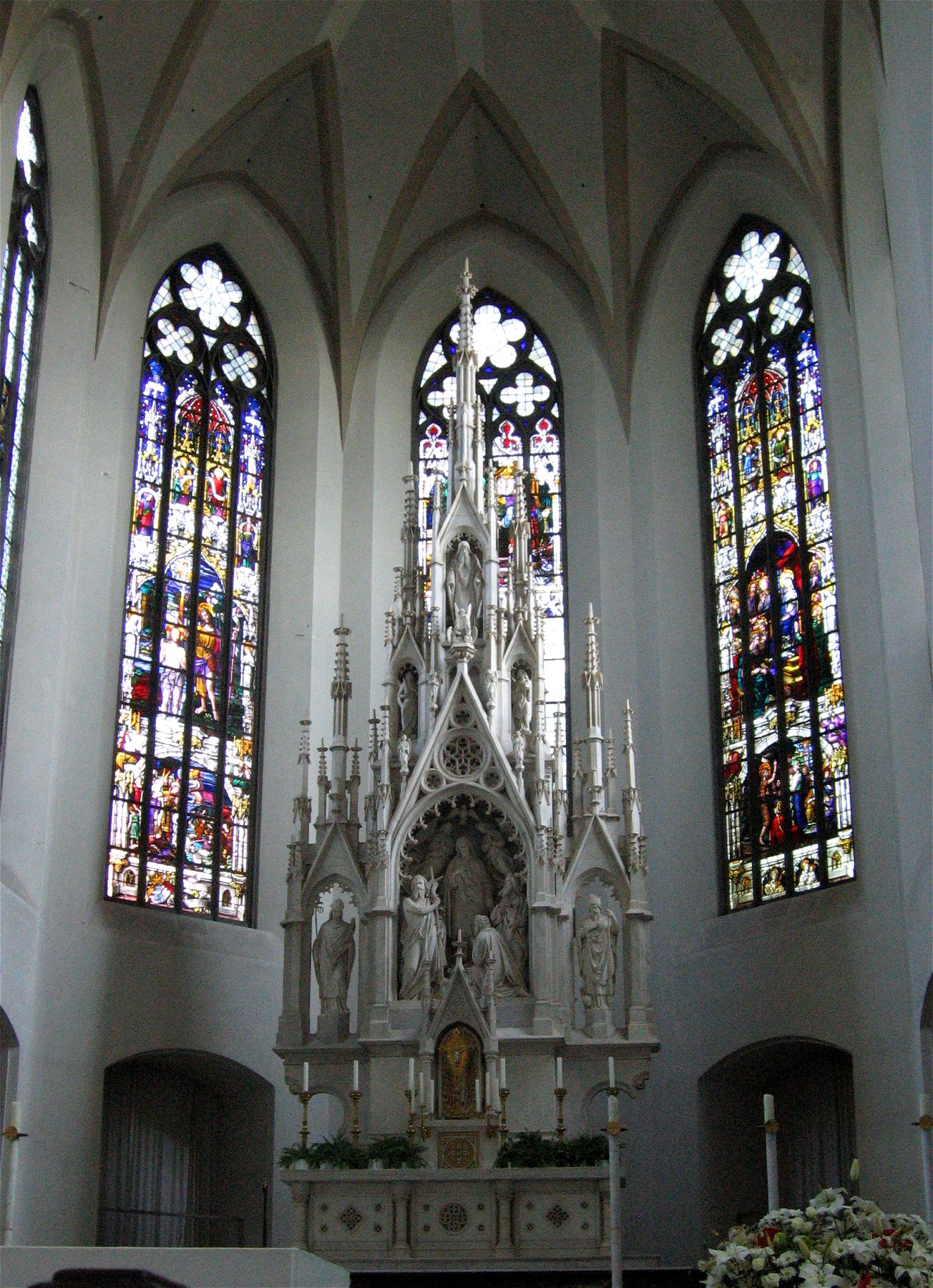
The main altar

The parish church of St. John the Baptist (German: Pfarrkirche St. Johann or Pfarrkirche St. Johannes der Täufer) is a Roman Catholic church in the Munich district of Haidhausen. It was designed by Matthias Berger on Locust Place in the Gothic Revival style. The west tower is 97 meters high, making it the third highest church in Munich.

== History ==
In the early 19th-century, the population of Munich grew sharply on both banks of the Isar. The old church of Haidhausen soon became too small to fit its growing congregation. Therefore, it was decided to construct a new, larger church. In the 1840s, the foundation stone for the church was laid.

Construction of St Johannes was mostly complete by 1858. However, it was not until 1870 that the tower was completed. Munich thus received its third largest church.

In 1945, the church was severely damaged by the attacks on Munich. After the war, the church was rebuilt and the tower received a new spire.

The bell tower has 6 bells. The small bronze bell of 1869 (cast by the Bachmair bell foundry) was joined in 1948 by five cast steel bells. On Fridays at 3 o'clock, the largest bell rings in memory of the death of Christ. This bell also rings for the Angelus at 12 o'clock every day.
