= Arabellapark =

Coordinates: 48.1519°N 11.6203°E

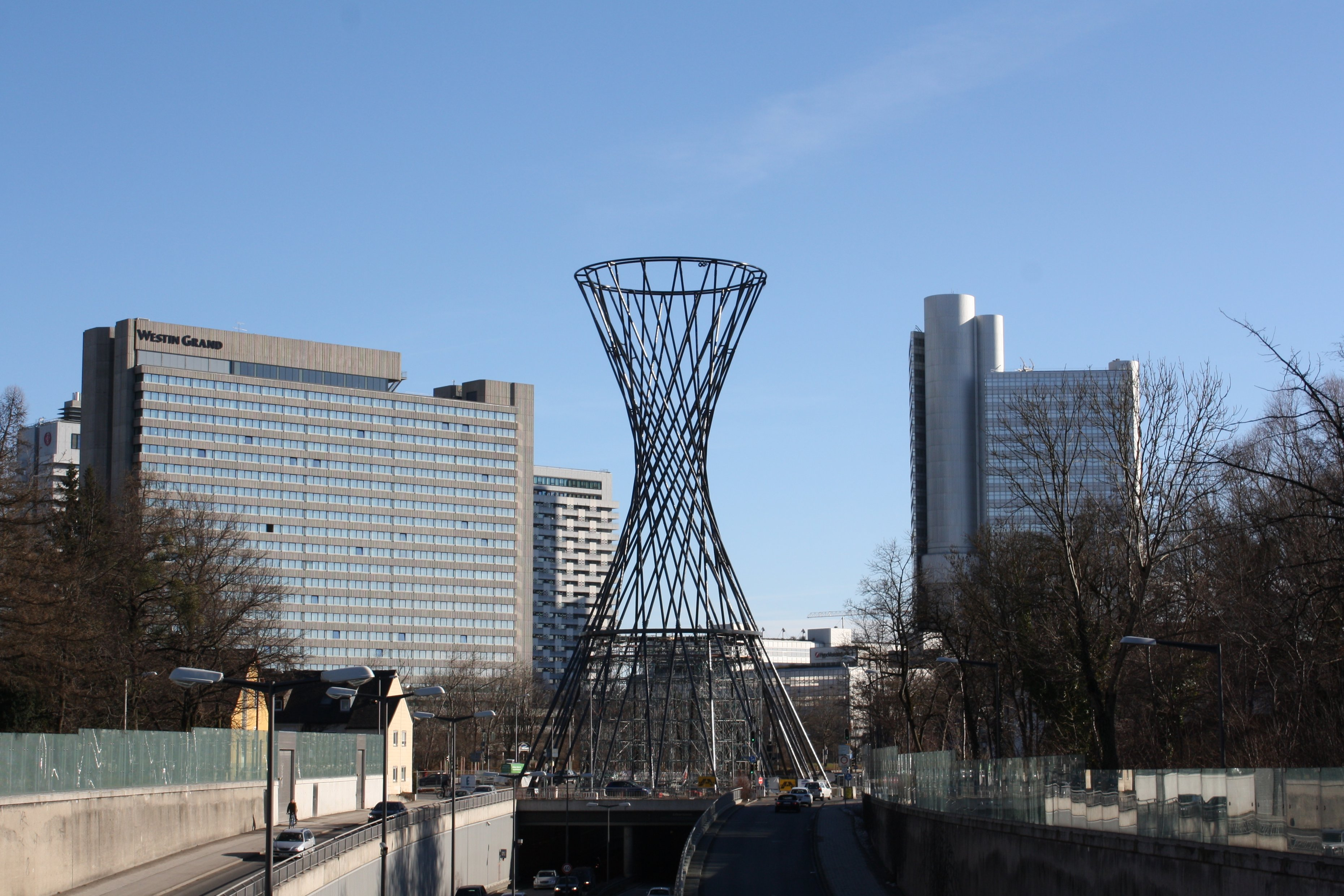
Arabellapark behind the Mae West landmark

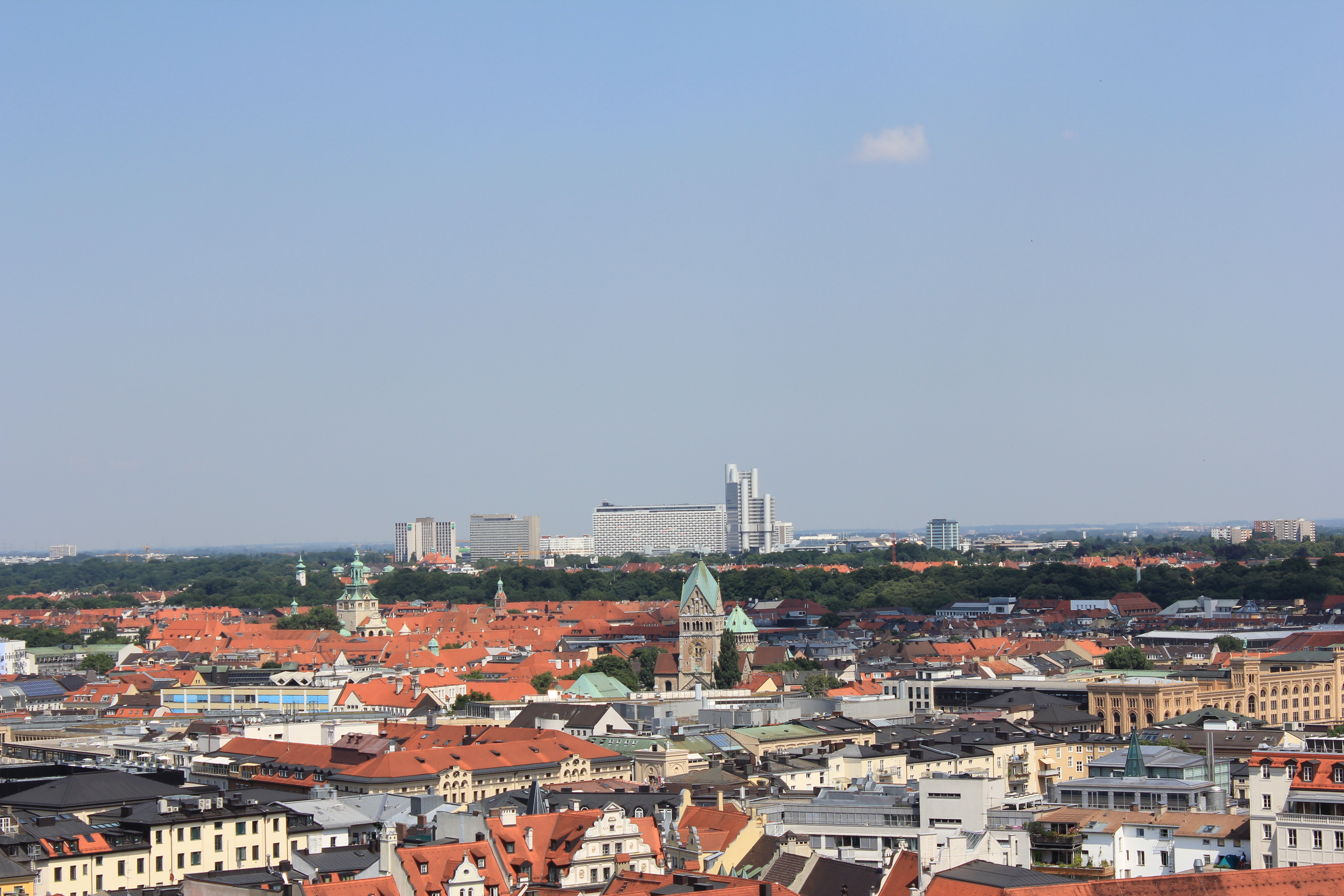
Arabellapark with HVB-Tower, Arabella-Hochhaus, the BayWa-Hochhaus and The Westin Hotel

Arabellapark is a residential and commercial area in the Bogenhausen district of Munich, Germany, which was developed with the construction of multiple buildings from 1965 to 1998. It is one of the largest urban expansion projects of the period after World War II in Munich. It takes its name from the Arabellastrasse, which runs through the project site.

== Location and Construction ==
Arabellapark is located in the east of Munich, and is surrounded by 4 major roads. Richard-Strauss-Strasse, part of the Mittlerer Ring (Central Ring), forms the western border, Englschalkinger Strasse the north, Vollmannstrasse the east and Denningerstrasse the south. Arabellapark is connected by line U4 to the Munich U-Bahn network from an underground station of the same name. Above the U-Bahn station is an overground bus station served by numerous local bus lines. The area contains shops, private residences and hotels but is predominantly offices. Arabellapark contains only a few small roads, and therefore the majority of these are reserved only for pedestrians. In over thirty years of construction, a variety of architectural styles and buildings of different heights have been constructed, that range from two-storey rows of shops to a high-rise buildings.

== Literature ==
- Willibald Karl (Ed.): Der Arabellapark. Eine Erfolgsstory. Buchendorfer Verlag, Munich 1998, ISBN 3-927984-90-6

== See also ==
- List of tallest buildings in Munich
- List of tallest buildings in Germany
