= Hochhaus Uptown München =

Skyscraper in the Moosach district of Munich, Germany

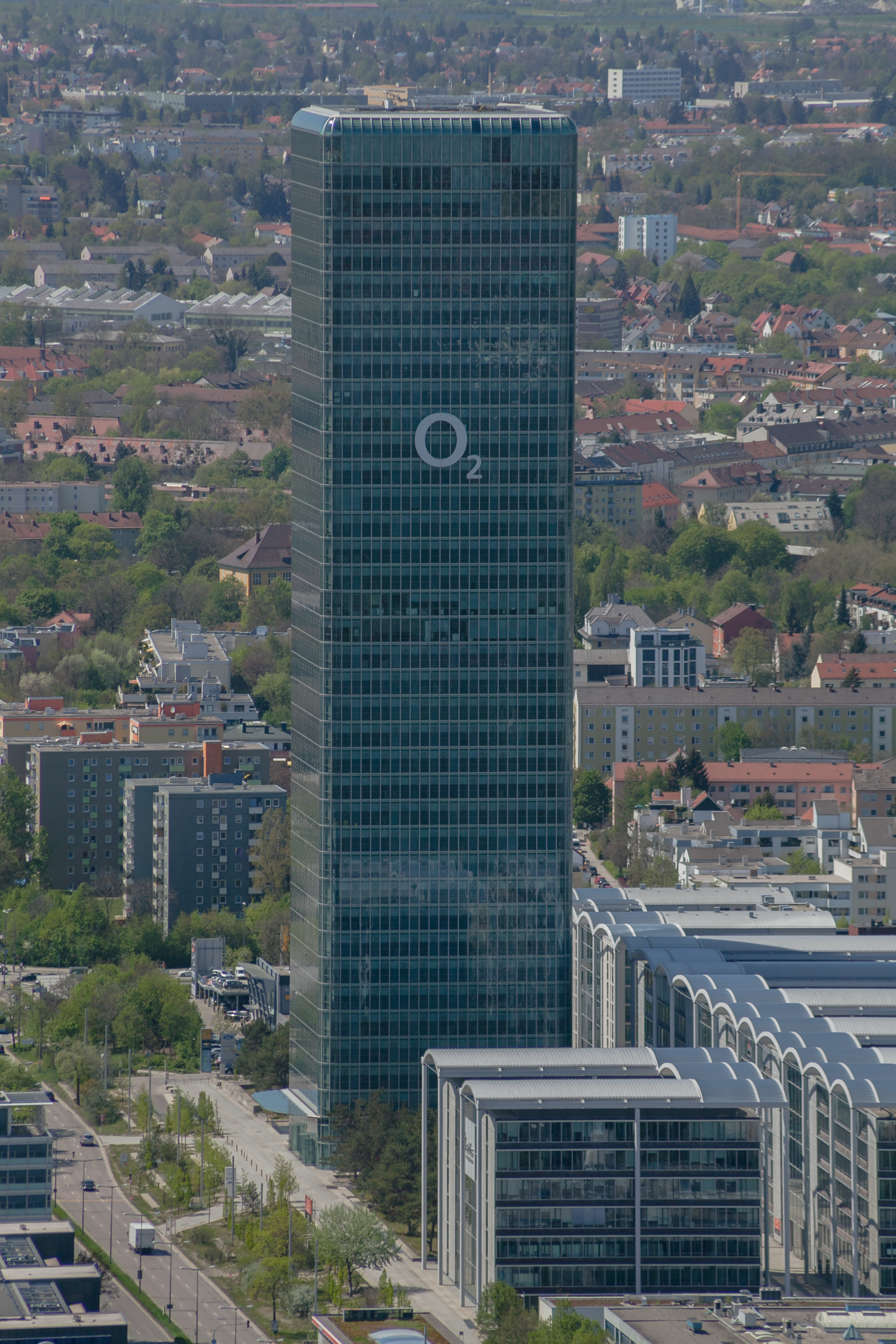

General information
- Type: Commercial offices
- Location: Riesstraße 17; Georg-Brauchle-Ring; Munich, Germany
- Coordinates: 48°10′37″N 11°31′54″E
- Completed: 2001–2004
- Cost: €300 million

Height
- Roof: 146 m (479 ft)

Technical details
- Floor count: 38; 3 below ground
- Floor area: 50,200 m^{2} (540,000 sq ft)

Design and construction
- Architect(s): Ingenhoven, Overdiek Architects
- Developer: Hines Immobilien GmbH
- Engineer: Burggraf, Weichinger + Partner
- Main contractor: Wayss & Freytag

Hochhaus Uptown München (English: Munich Uptown Building) is a 146 m (479 ft) skyscraper in the Moosach district of Munich, Germany. The 38-storey tower is the tallest skyscraper in the city.

The building's glass facade wraps the structure of the building like a tensioned membrane. Circular ventilation elements in the form of individually opening windows enable natural ventilation and provide a reference to the outside world by making the background noise noticeable even on the upper floors.

The tower with 50,200 m^{2} (540,000 sq ft) is flanked by four seven-storey buildings (approximately 8,525 m^{2} (91,760 sq ft) each) joined together by a campus that has a transparent roof. A fifth building houses 139 apartments.

== Construction ==
The Uptown München is a city block near the Olympiastadion but was conceived as a public transport connected self-contained town within the city of Munich. Within the agenda of sustainable urbanism the architects had to integrate the nearby Georg-Brauchle-Ring underground train station within the basement of the 38-floor tower. The signature tower was supplemented by four atrium buildings and a campus surrounded by landscaped public space.

Uptown Munich was probably one of the main triggers for the efforts of the initiative "Our Munich" initiated by ex-mayor Georg Kronawitter, which culminated in a citizens' vote on November 21, 2004 preventing the construction of other buildings of this height in Munich. It was planned by the architects Ingenhoven, Overdiek (Düsseldorf) and built from 2001 to 2004. The cuboid structure has been much disputed. In November 2004, a referendum in Munich was held to decide whether the construction of high-rise buildings in the inner city should be prohibited.

In August 2006, the skyscraper and one of the campus buildings was bought by the Government of Singapore for more than €300 million. In 2017 the building was sold to Europa Capital and Bayern Projekt.

== Tenants ==
Telefónica Europe (O_{2}) is the building's anchor tenant.

== Gallery ==
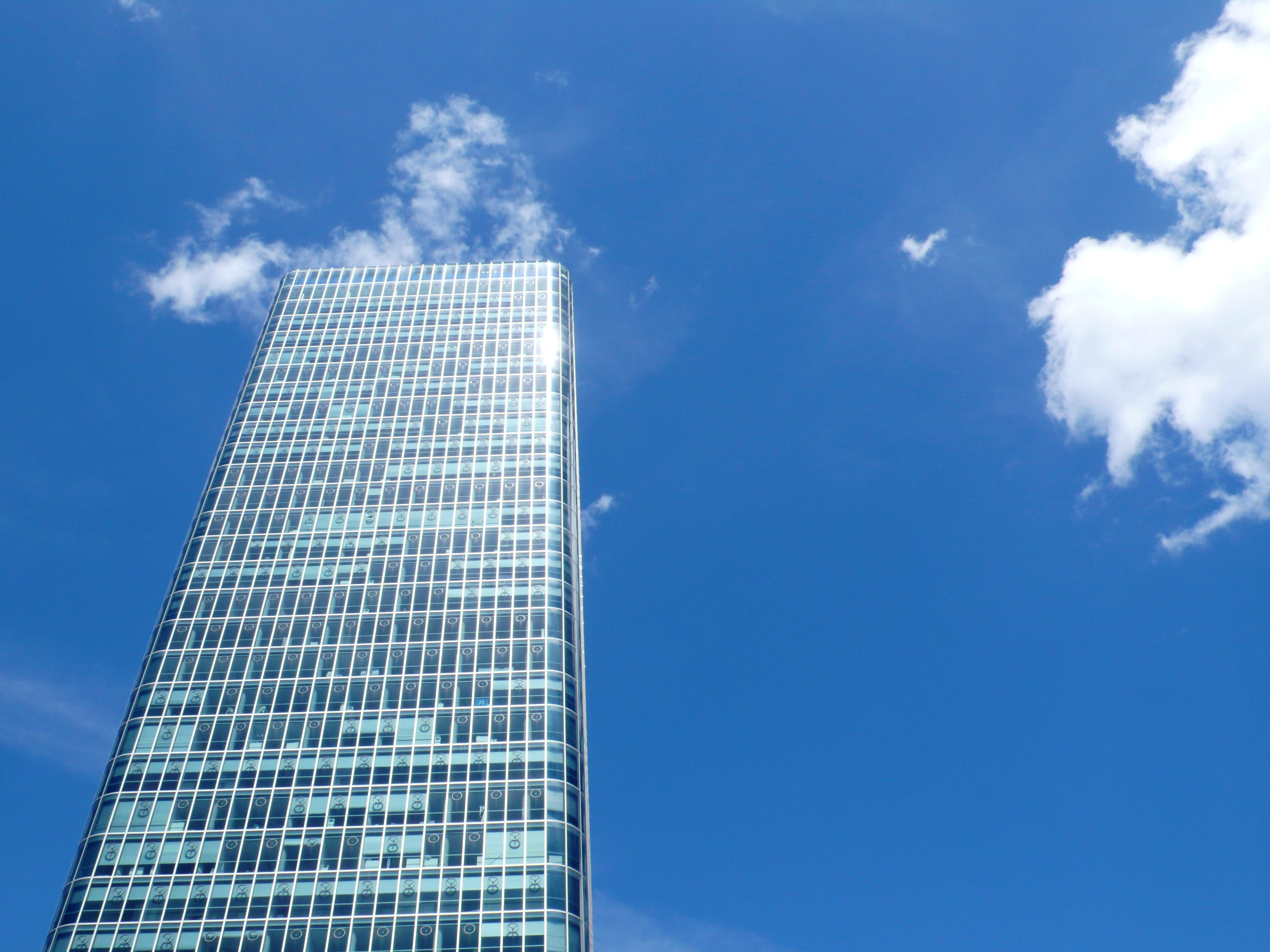

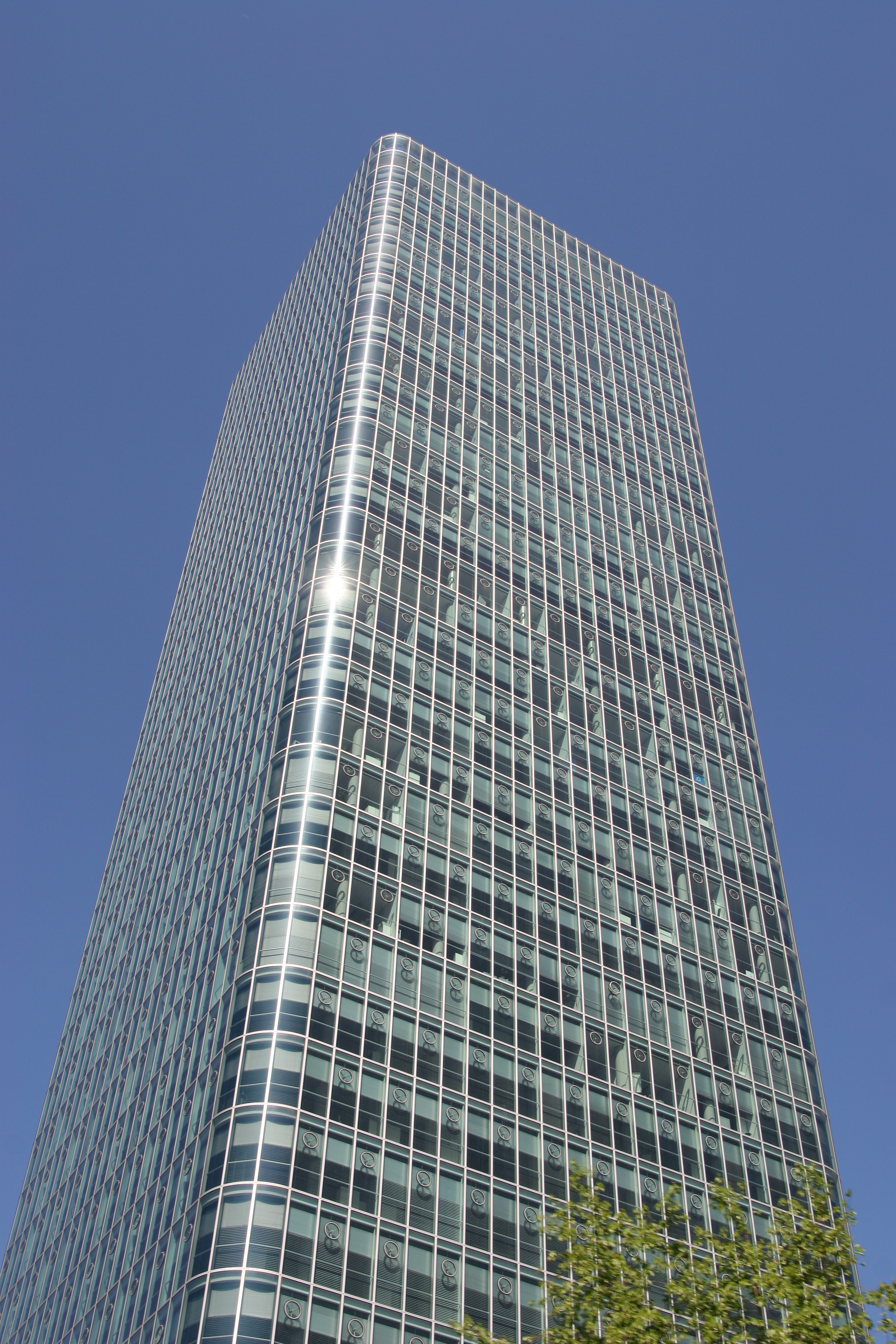

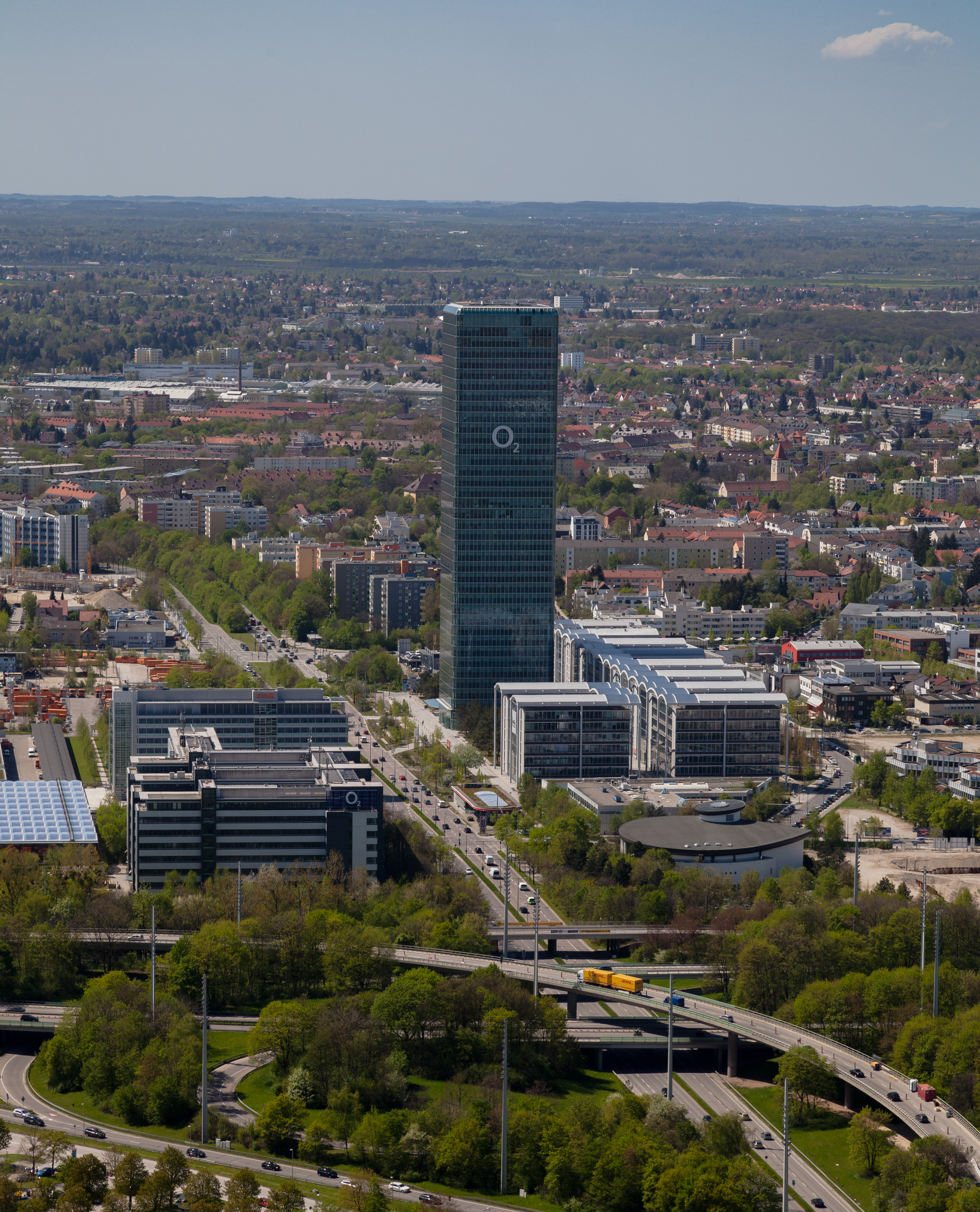

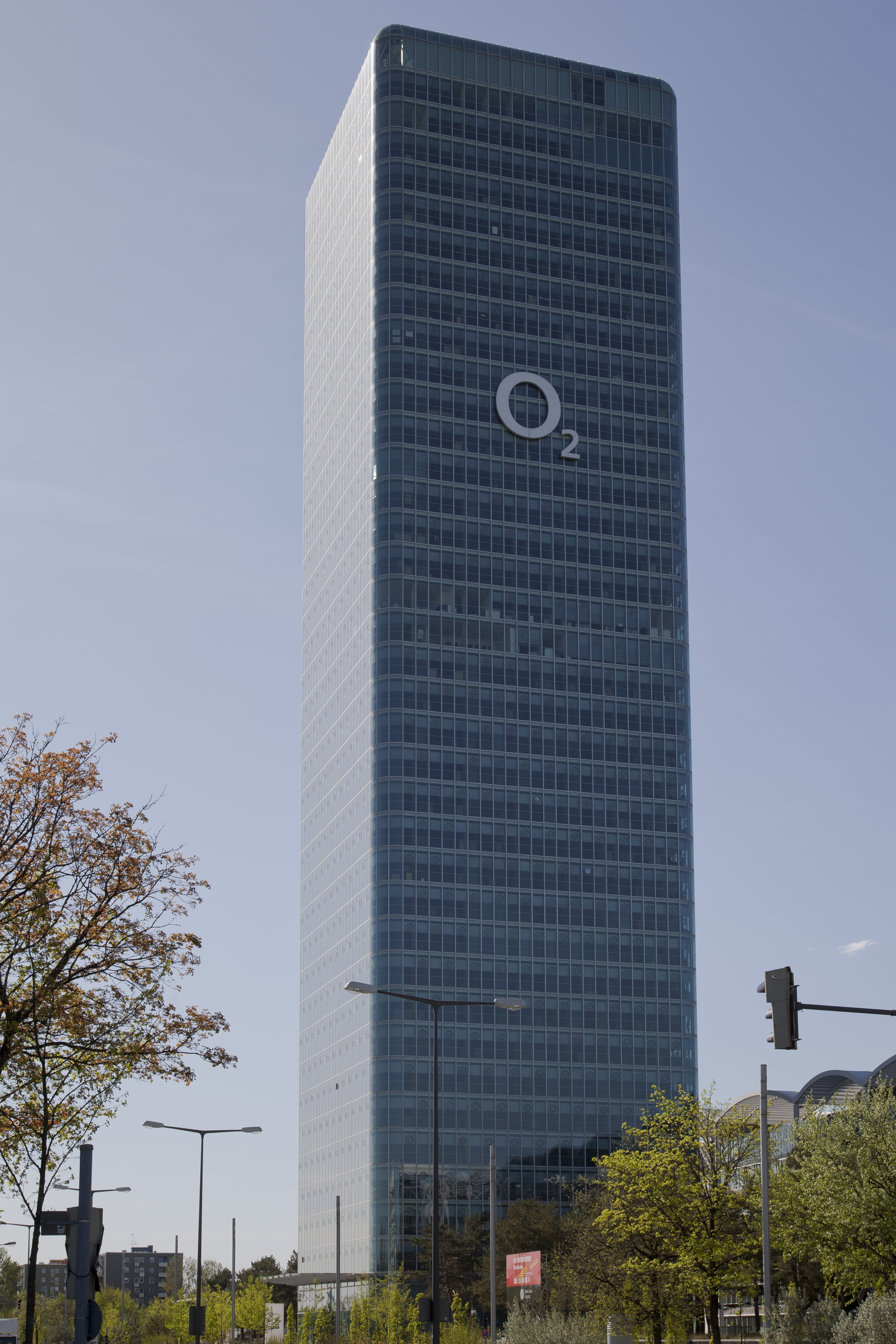
