= Max-Weber-Platz station =

Station of the Munich U-Bahn

Max-Weber-Platz
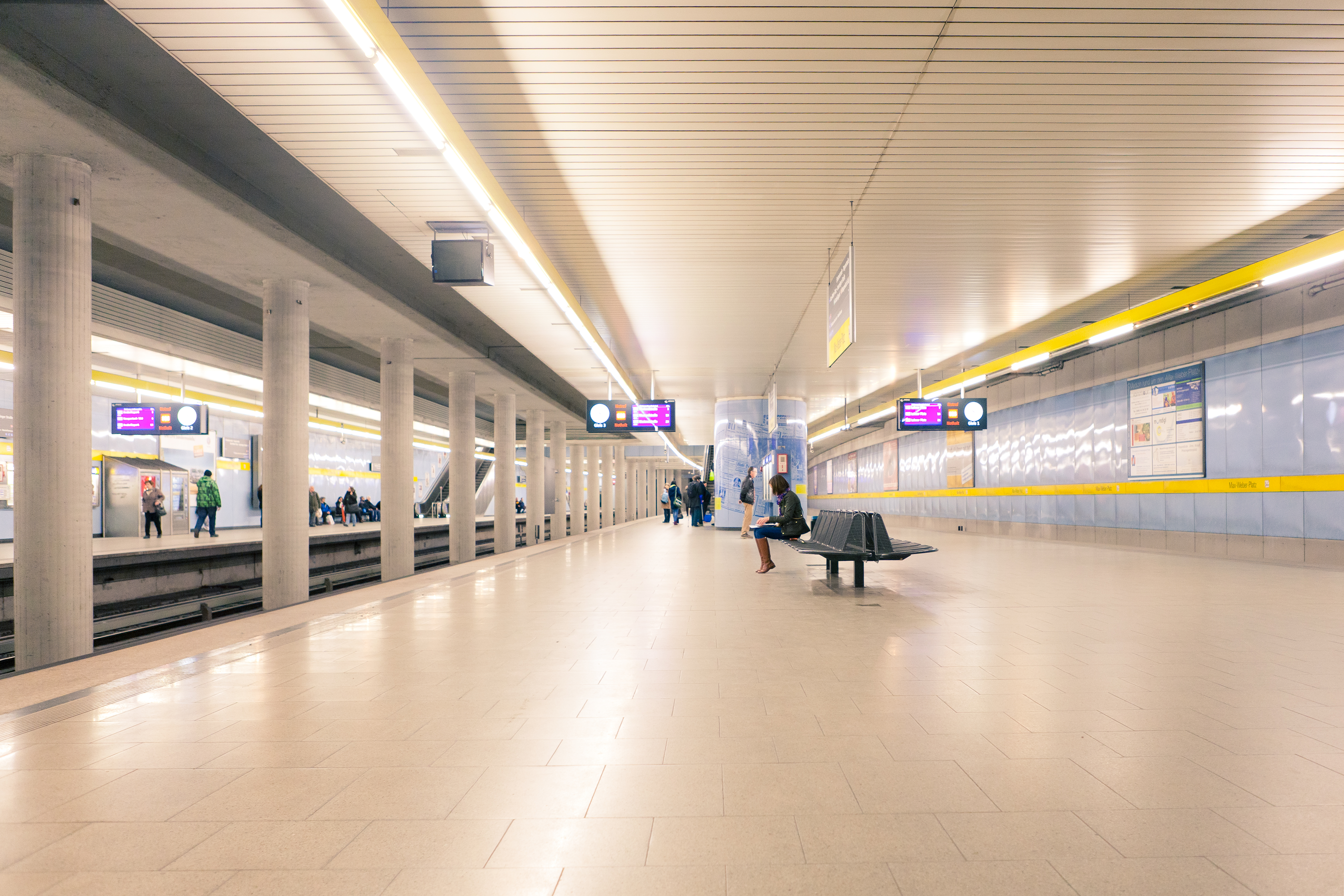

General information
- Location: Max-Weber-Platz, Au-Haidhausen; Munich, Germany
- Coordinates: 48°08′08″N 11°35′52″E
- Platforms: 1 island platform 1 side platform
- Tracks: 3

Construction
- Structure type: Underground
- Accessible: Yes

Other information
- Fare zone: : M

History
- Opened: 27 October 1988

Services
Preceding station	Munich U-Bahn	Following station
Lehel towards Westendstraße	U4	Prinzregentenplatz towards Arabellapark
Lehel towards Laimer Platz	U5	Ostbahnhof towards Neuperlach Süd
Location

Max-Weber-Platz is a Munich U-Bahn interchange station on the U4 and U5 lines in the borough of Haidhausen. The station is located under Max-Weber-Platz, just east of the Landtag of Bavaria. The square was originally named after a local politician but from 1998 also after the similarly named and more known sociologist.

Max-Weber-Platz station is a transport hub for the Haidhausen quarter, allowing interchange between U-Bahn, bus and tramway services. The station is serviced by the bus lines X30, 190 and 191 as well as lines,, and of the Munich tramway.

In the first entresol, a replica of a historic Munich horsecar wagon (geschlossener Pferdebahnwagen Nr. 87 Typ a 1.41), which had been used between 1876 and 1895, is on display.
