= Munich Karlsplatz station =

Station of the Munich S-Bahn and U-Bahn

München Karlsplatz
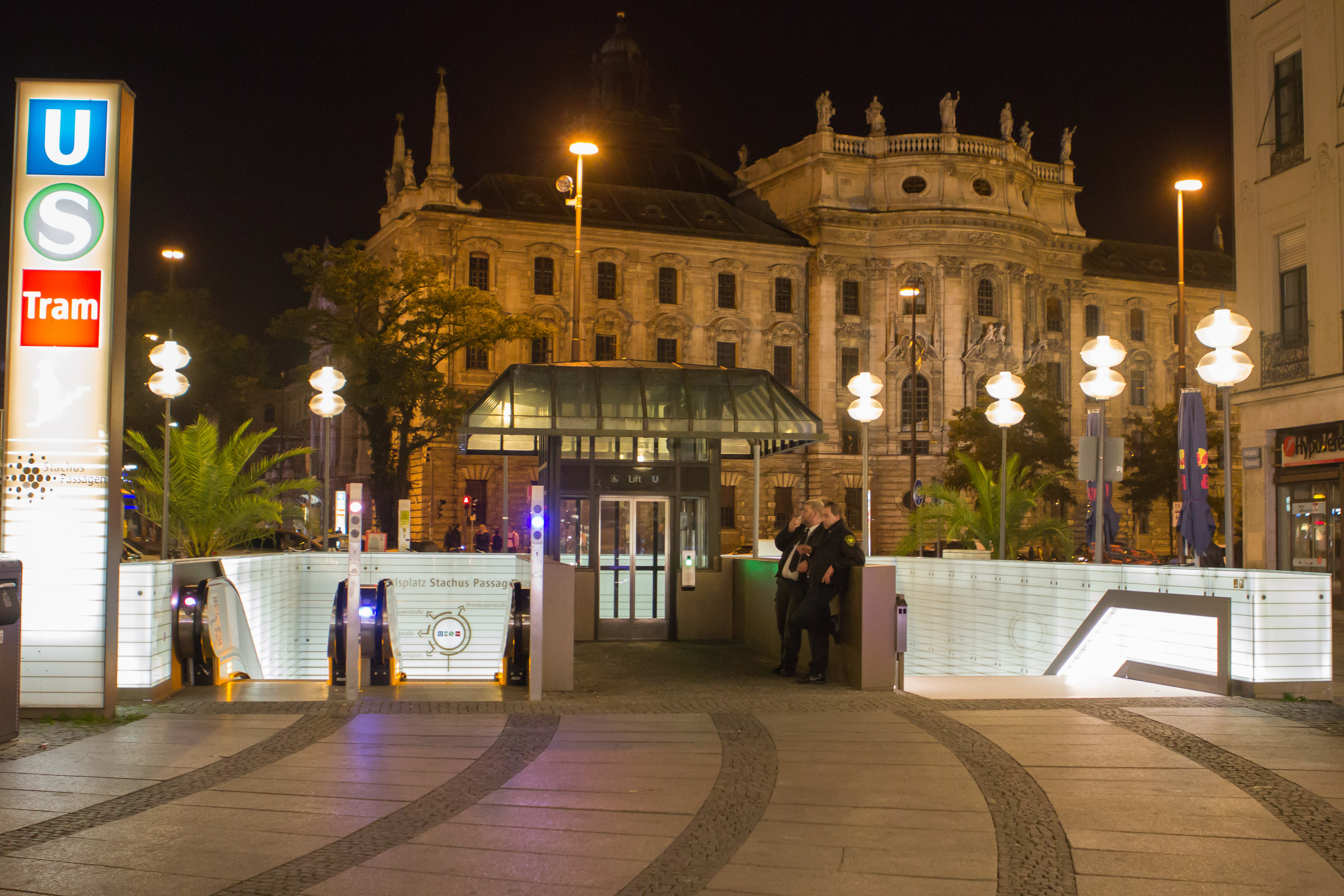

General information
- Location: Altstadt-Lehel, Munich, Bavaria; Germany
- Coordinates: 48°08′21″N 11°33′57″E
- Owner: Deutsche Bahn; Stadtwerke München
- Operator: DB Netz; DB Station&Service; Münchner Verkehrsgesellschaft
- Lines: S-Bahn trunk line (KBS 999)
- Platforms: 1 island platform (Spanish solution); 1 island platform
- Tracks: 2; 2
- Connections: N40, N41, N45

Construction
- Accessible: Yes

Other information
- Station code: 4237
- DS100 code: MKP
- IBNR: 8004132
- Category: 3
- Fare zone: : M
- Website: stationsdatenbank.de; www.bahnhof.de

History
- Opened: 1972

Passengers
- 87,700 daily (S-Bahn)

Services
Preceding station	Munich S-Bahn	Following station
München Hbf towards Freising or Flughafen	S1	Marienplatz towards Leuchtenbergring
München Hbf towards Petershausen or Altomünster	S2	Marienplatz towards Erding
München Hbf towards Mammendorf	S3	Marienplatz towards Holzkirchen
München Hbf towards Geltendorf	S4	Marienplatz towards Ebersberg
München Hbf towards Weßling	S5	Marienplatz towards Kreuzstraße
München Hbf towards Tutzing	S6	Marienplatz towards Ebersberg
München Hbf towards Herrsching	S8	Marienplatz towards Flughafen
Preceding station	Munich U-Bahn	Following station
Hauptbahnhof towards Westendstraße	U4	Odeonsplatz towards Arabellapark
Hauptbahnhof towards Laimer Platz	U5	Odeonsplatz towards Neuperlach Süd
Location

Munich Karlsplatz is an underground S-Bahn and U-Bahn station below the Karlsplatz in central Munich. It is one of the busiest stations in Munich, as it is located at the western end of Munich's Altstadt (Old Town).

Karlsplatz is also a stop on the Munich tramway, located on the Altstadtring, the Old Town's periphery road. This stop is served by routes,,,,,,, and.

The underground facilities were built as part of the S-Bahn tunnel through central Munich in the early 1970s.

== Levels ==
The station is divided into five levels.

=== Level 1 (Stachus Passagen) ===
The first level, just below road level, is home to a large shopping mall (the Stachus Passagen) which is due for renovation in the next few years. Large store chains have branches here, for instance Kaufhof and Woolworths.

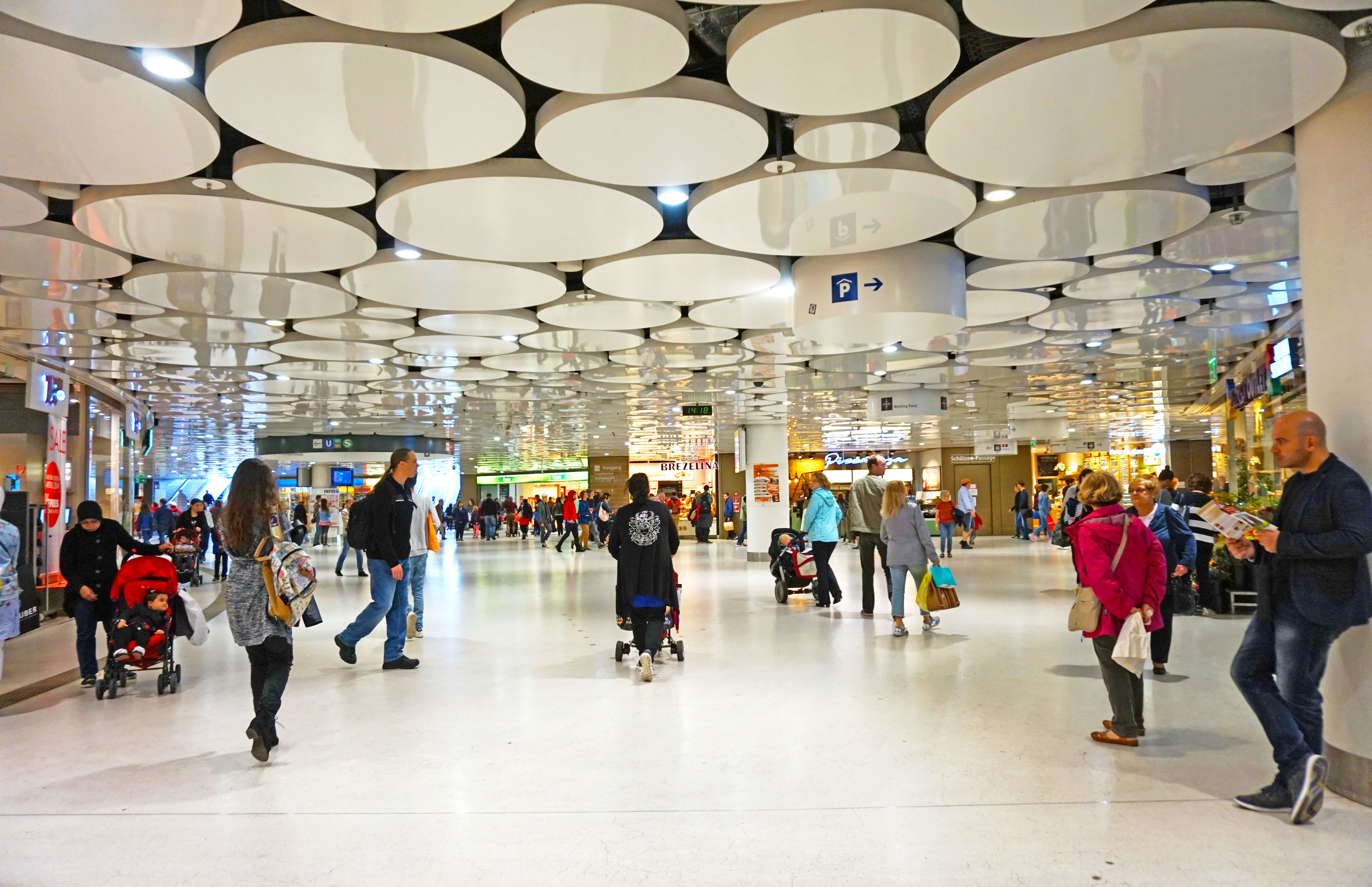

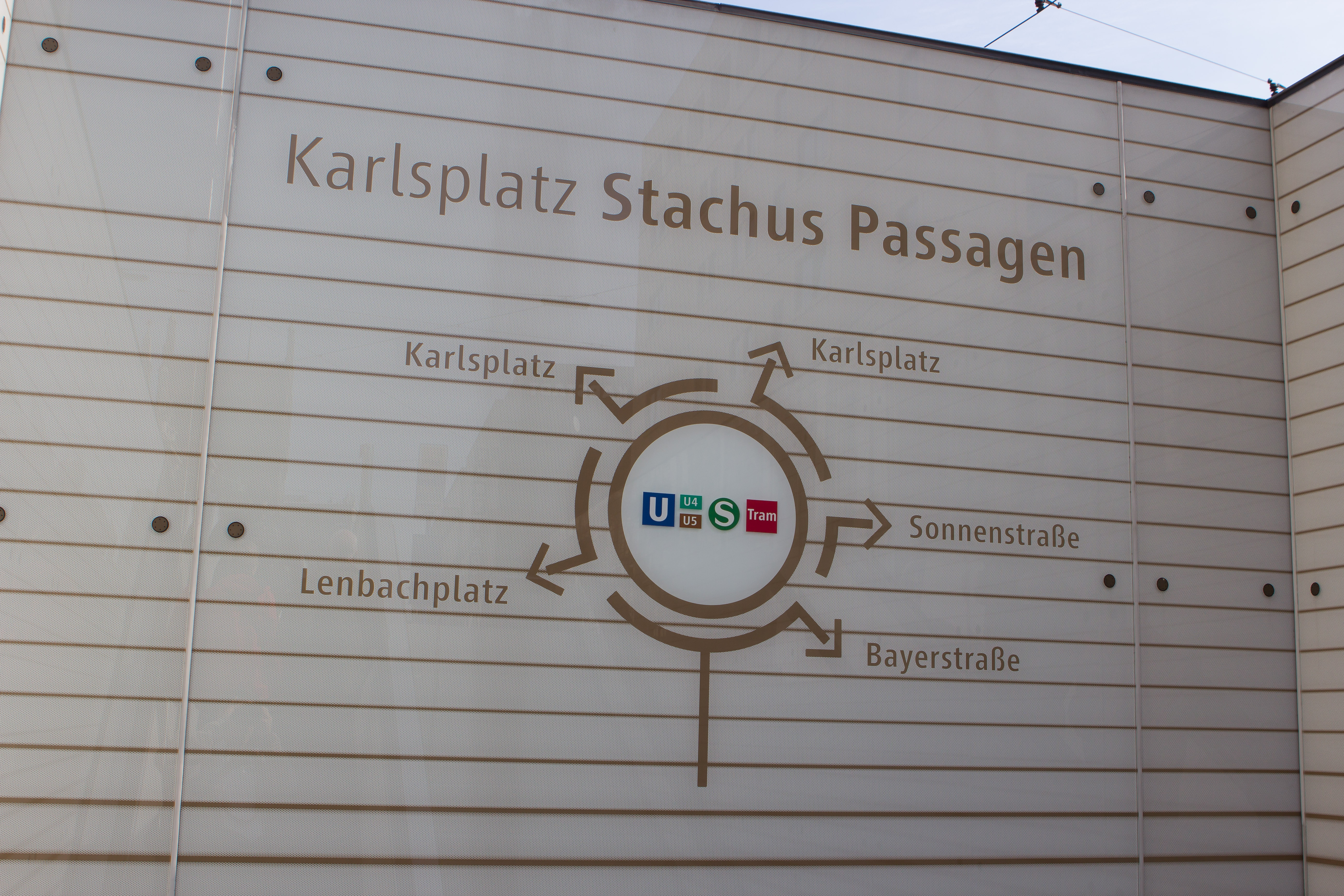

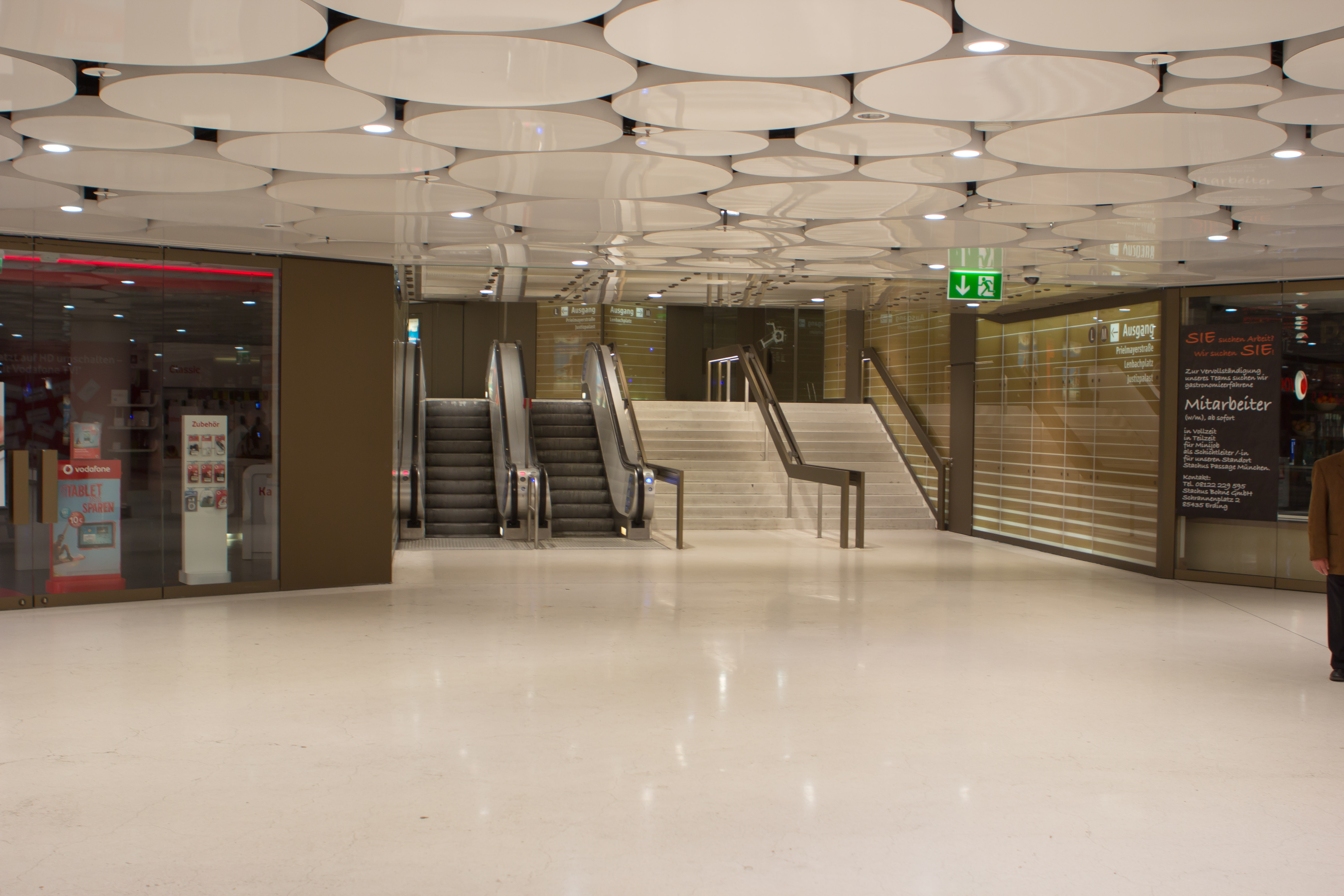

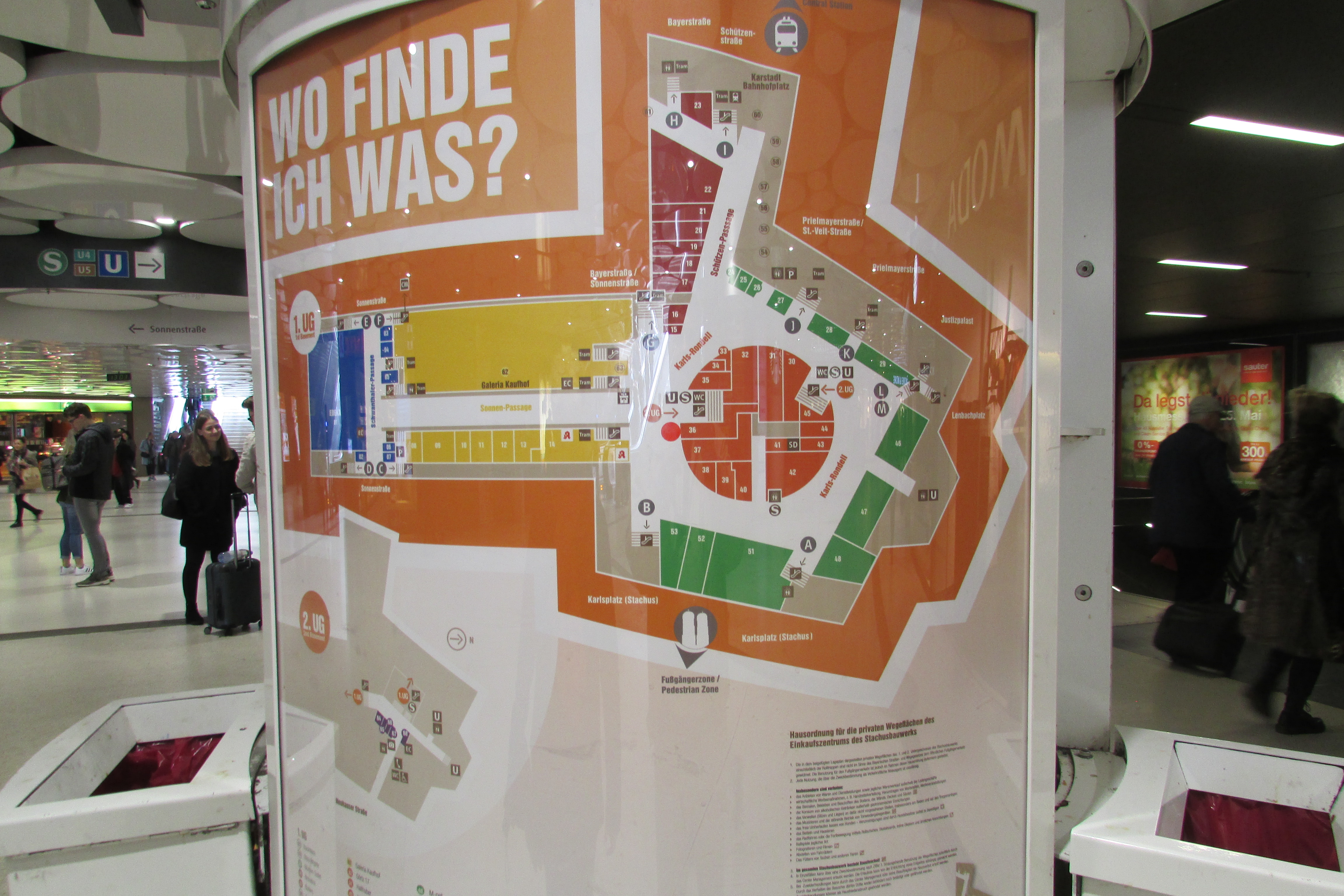

=== Level 2 ===
Level two has a branch of the Stadtsparkasse München, a large local bank, as well as ticket counters and eateries.

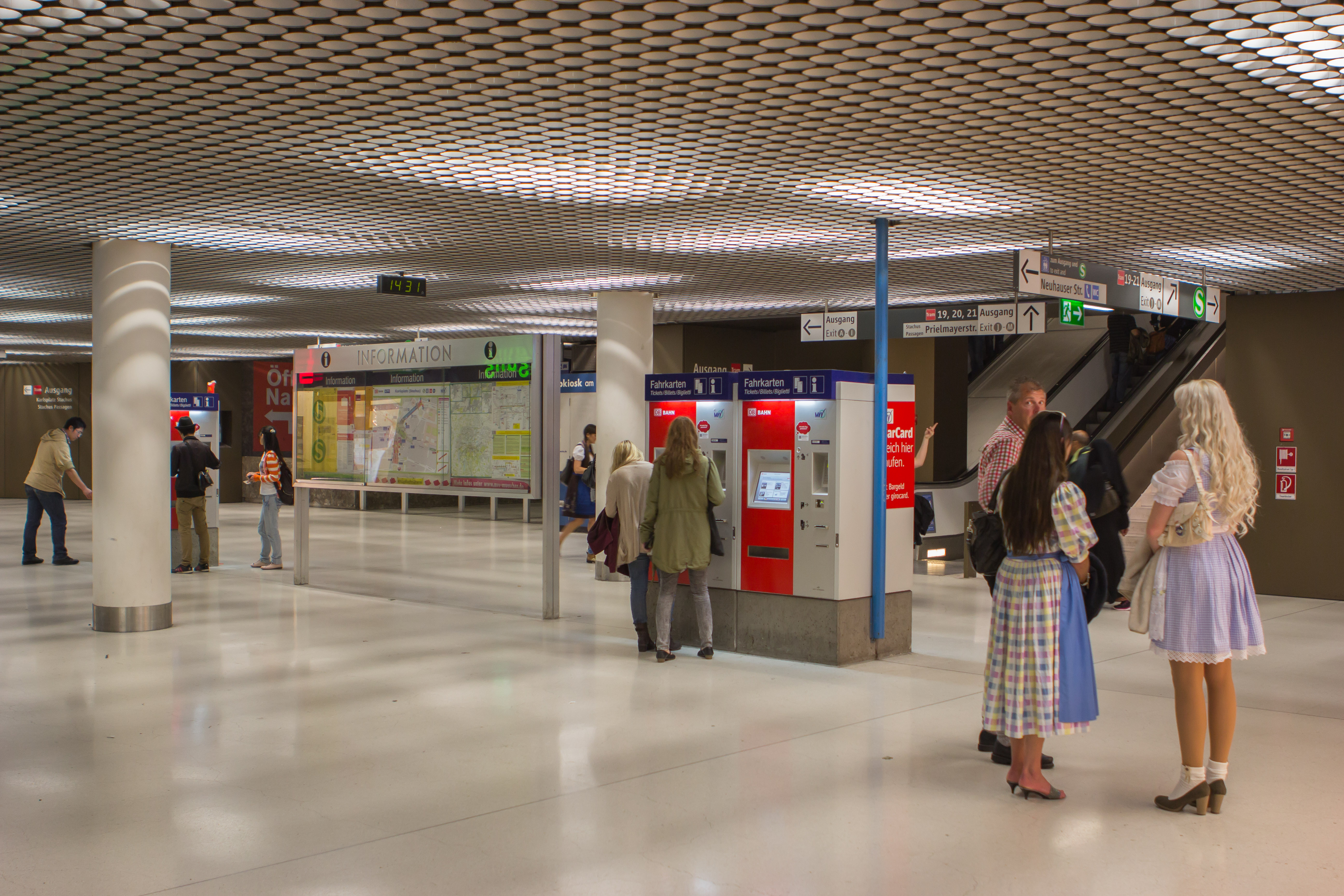

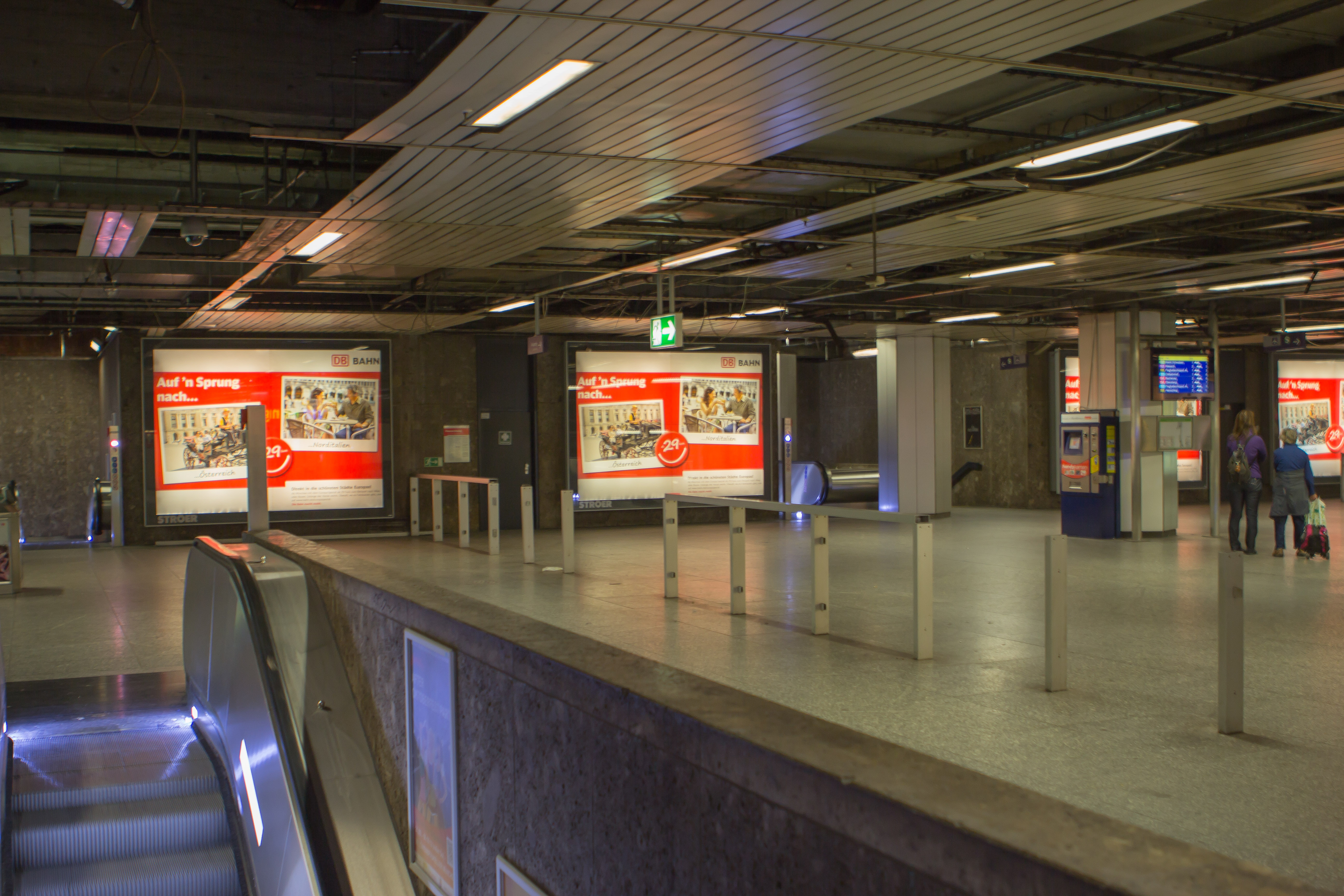

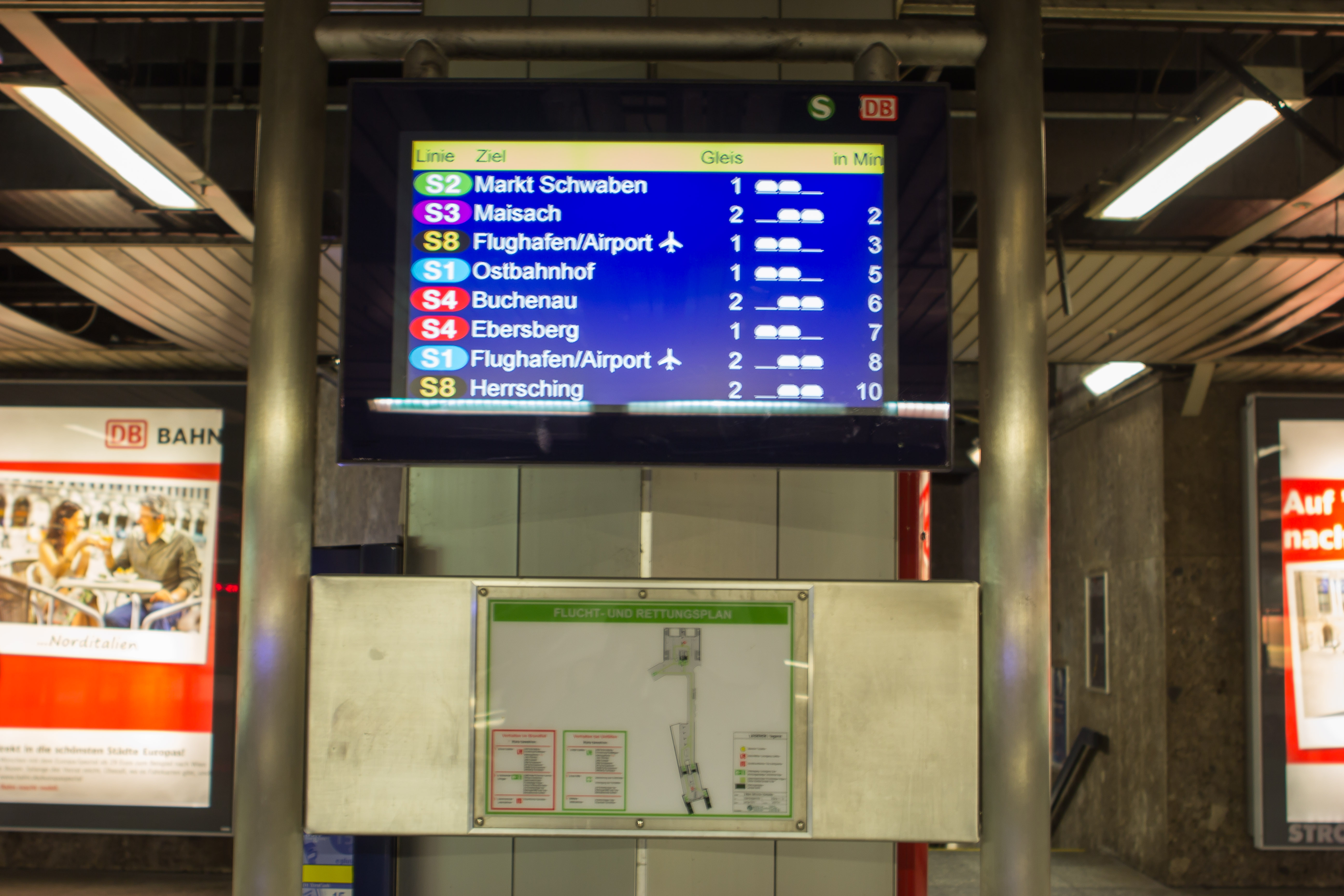

=== Level 3 ===
The third level holds the S-Bahn station with two tracks and three platforms, arranged in the Spanish solution: The island platform is for boarding only and the side platforms are for disembarking. The lines,,,, and call at this station.

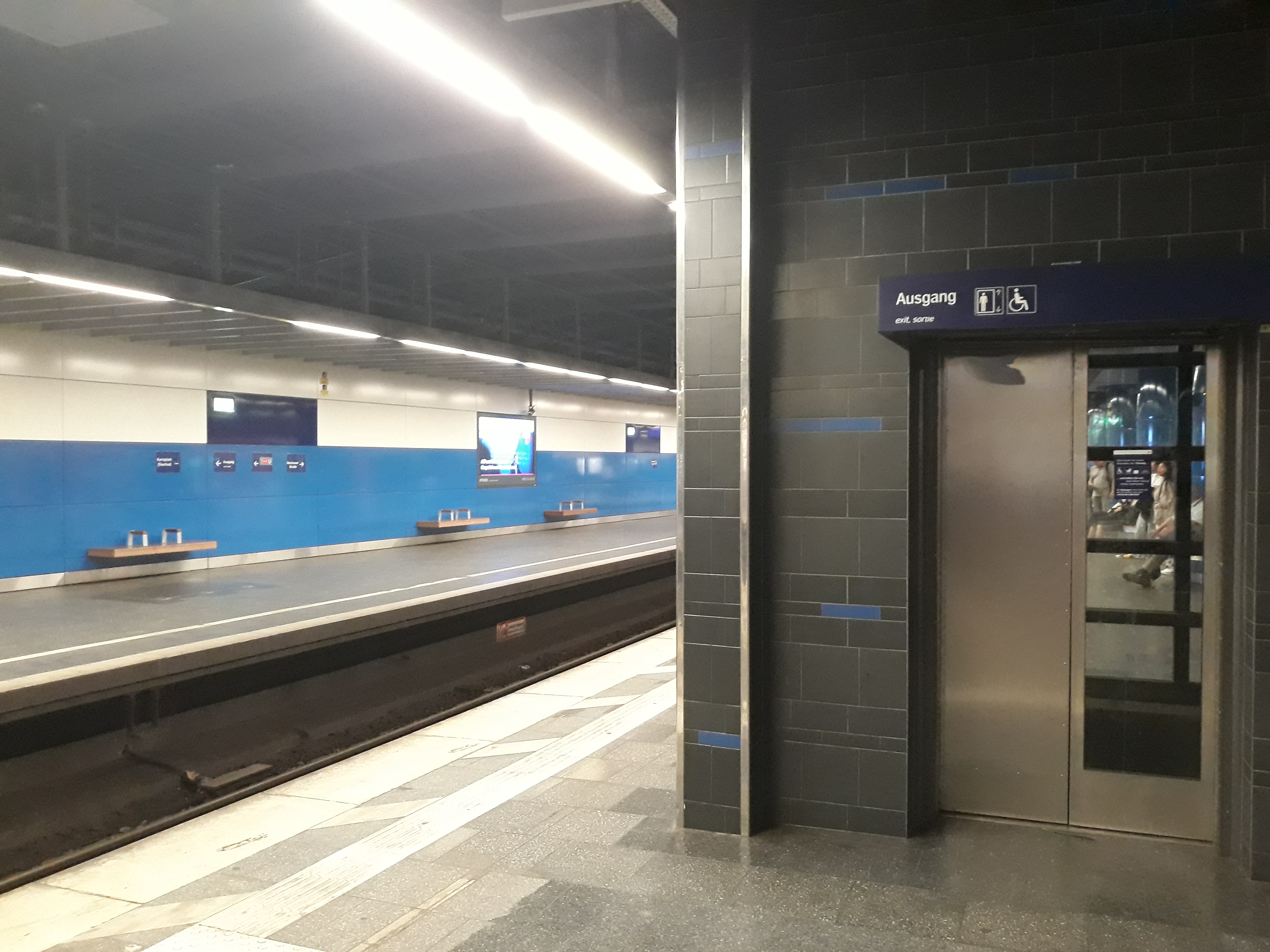

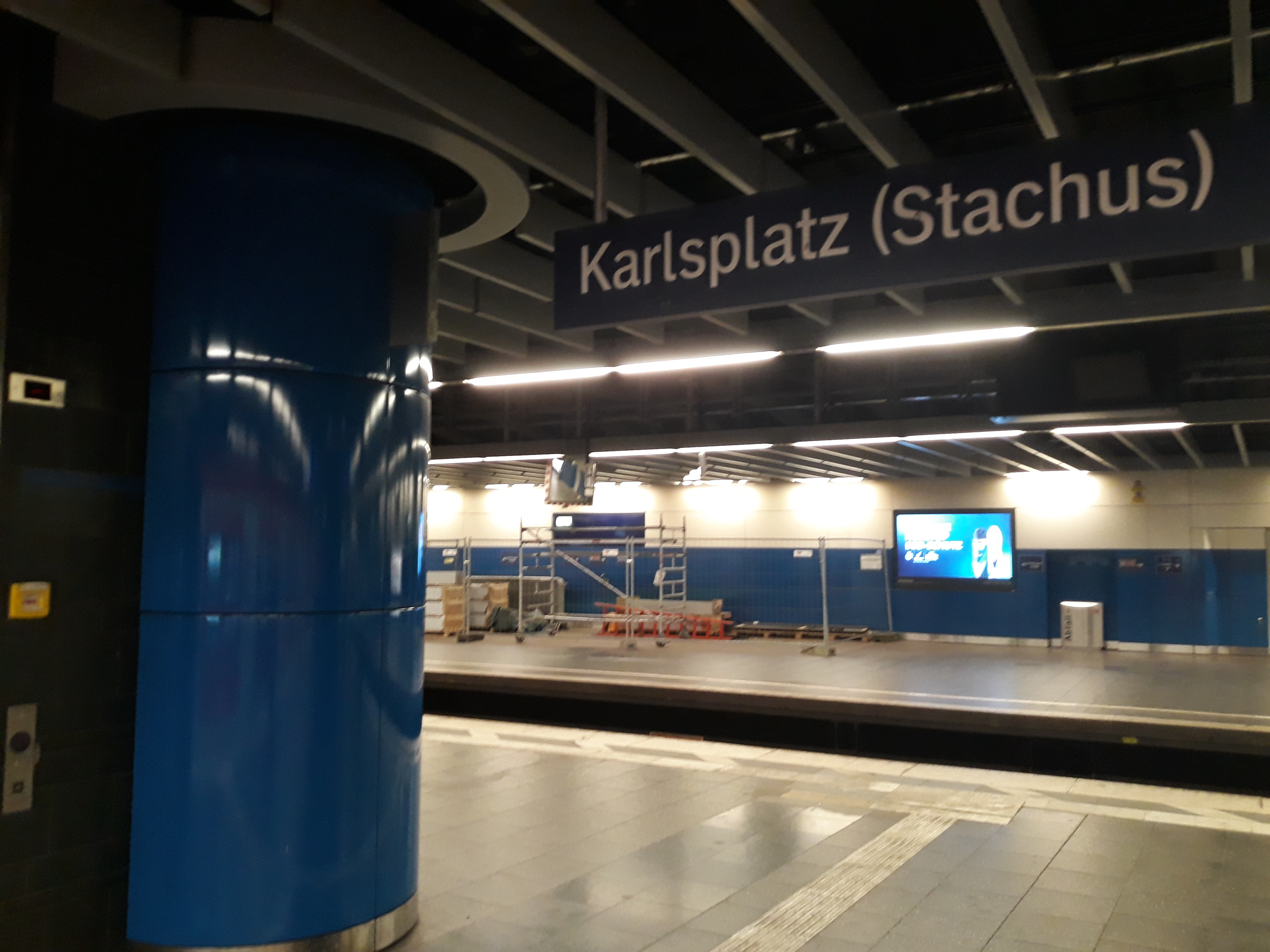

=== Level 4 ===
The fourth level allows interchange between the S-Bahn and U-Bahn.

=== Level 5 ===
The fifth level holds the U-Bahn station with two tracks and two platforms. Lines and call here, travelling in a north-west direction. The station is the deepest in the whole network and also has the longest escalator.

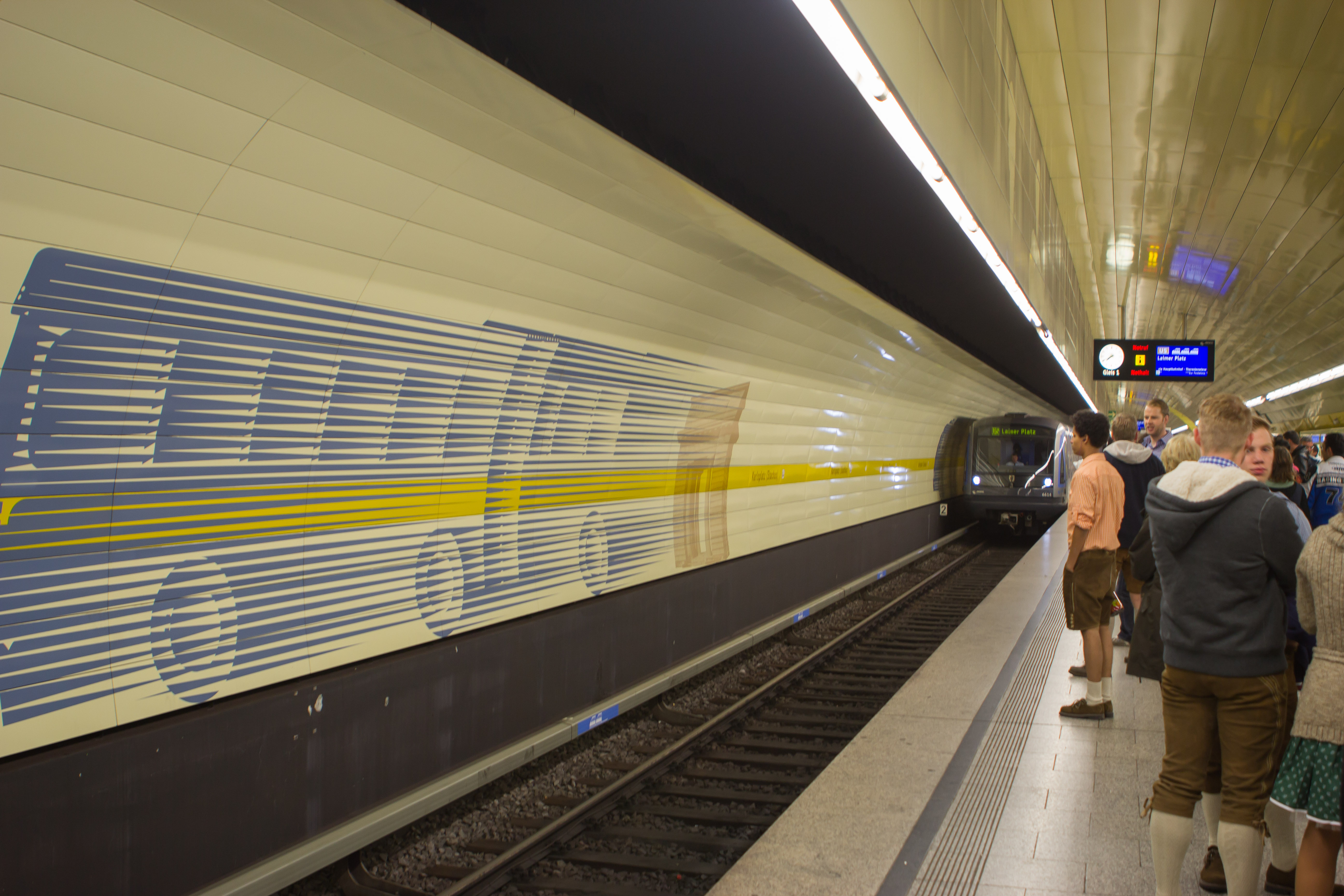

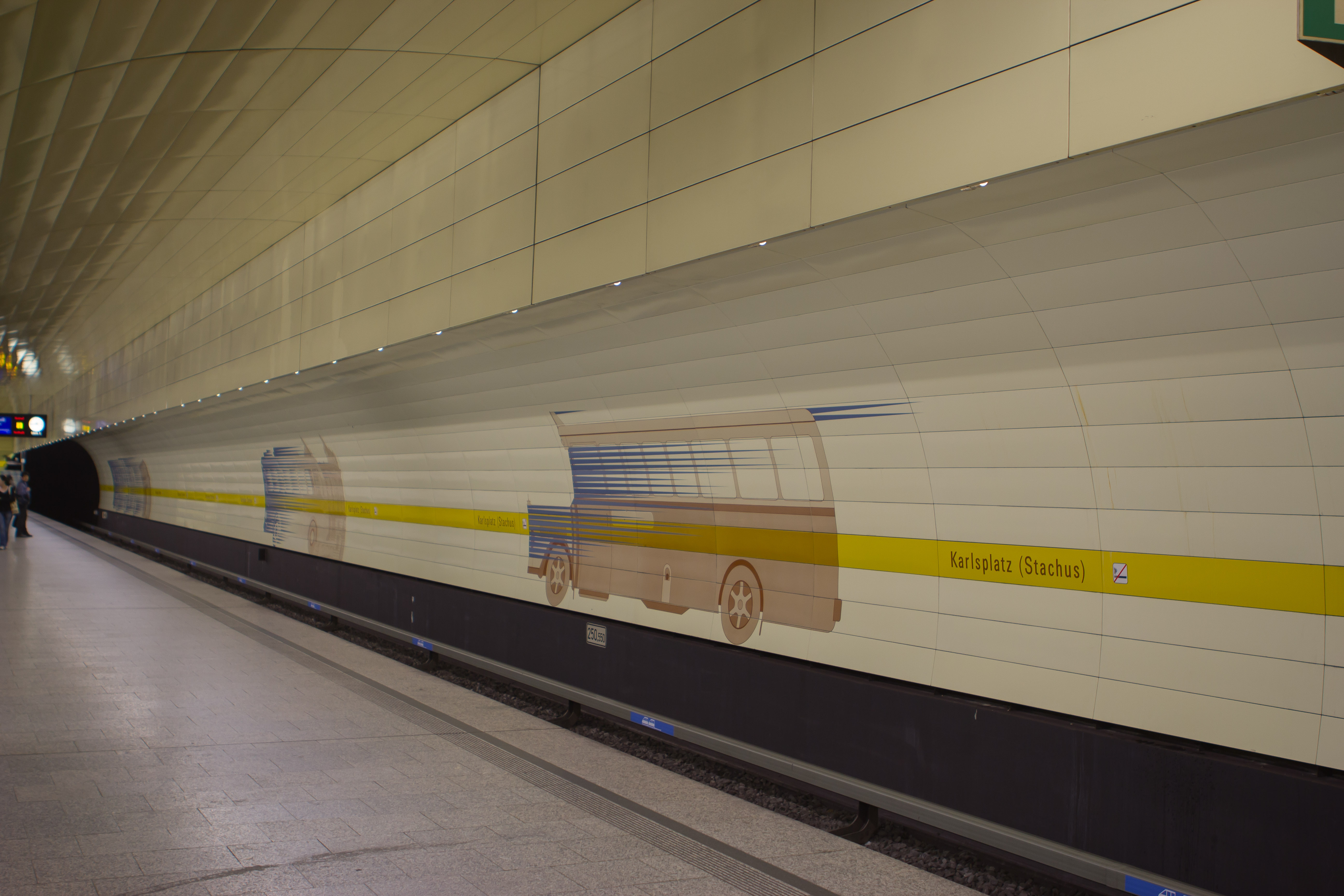

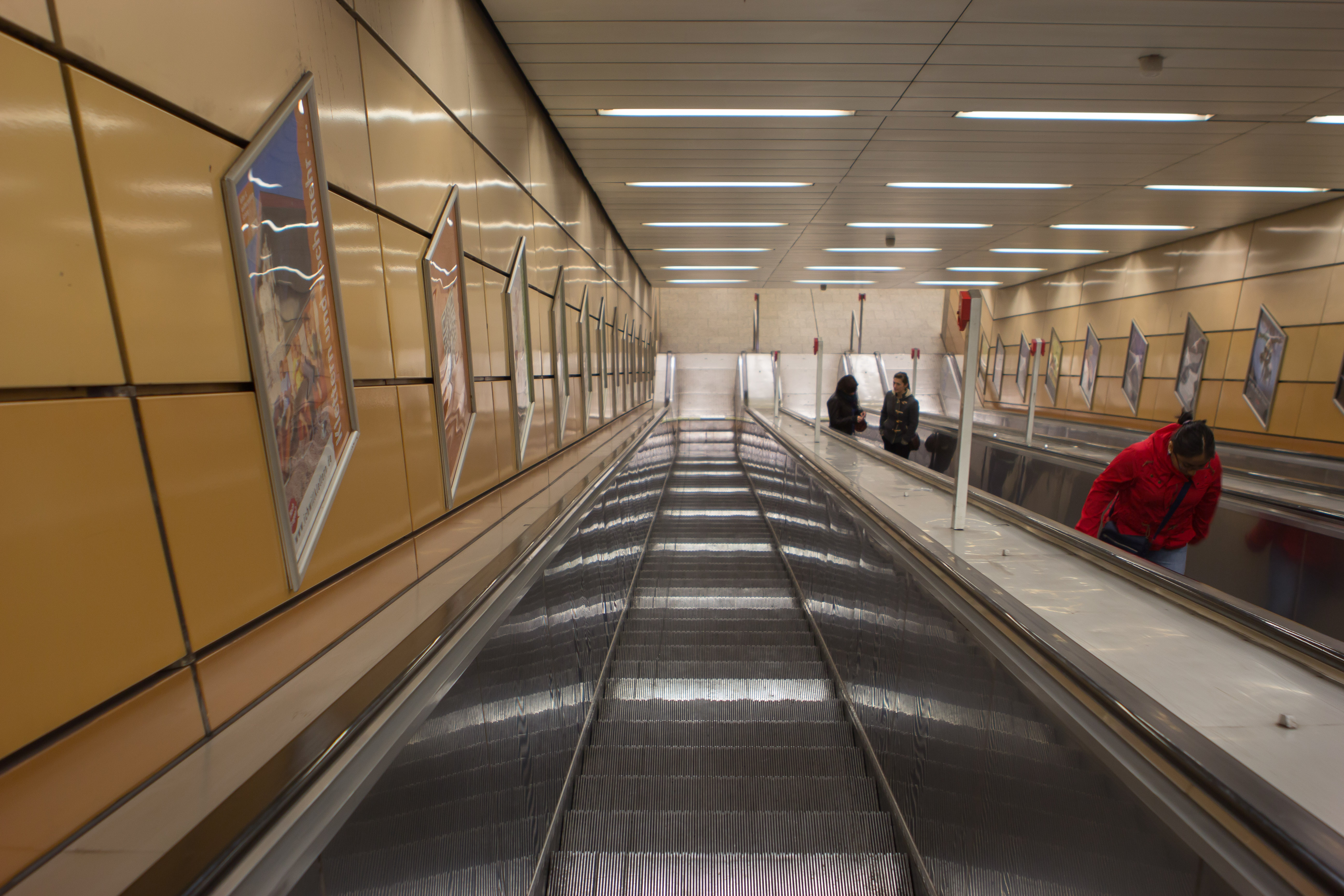

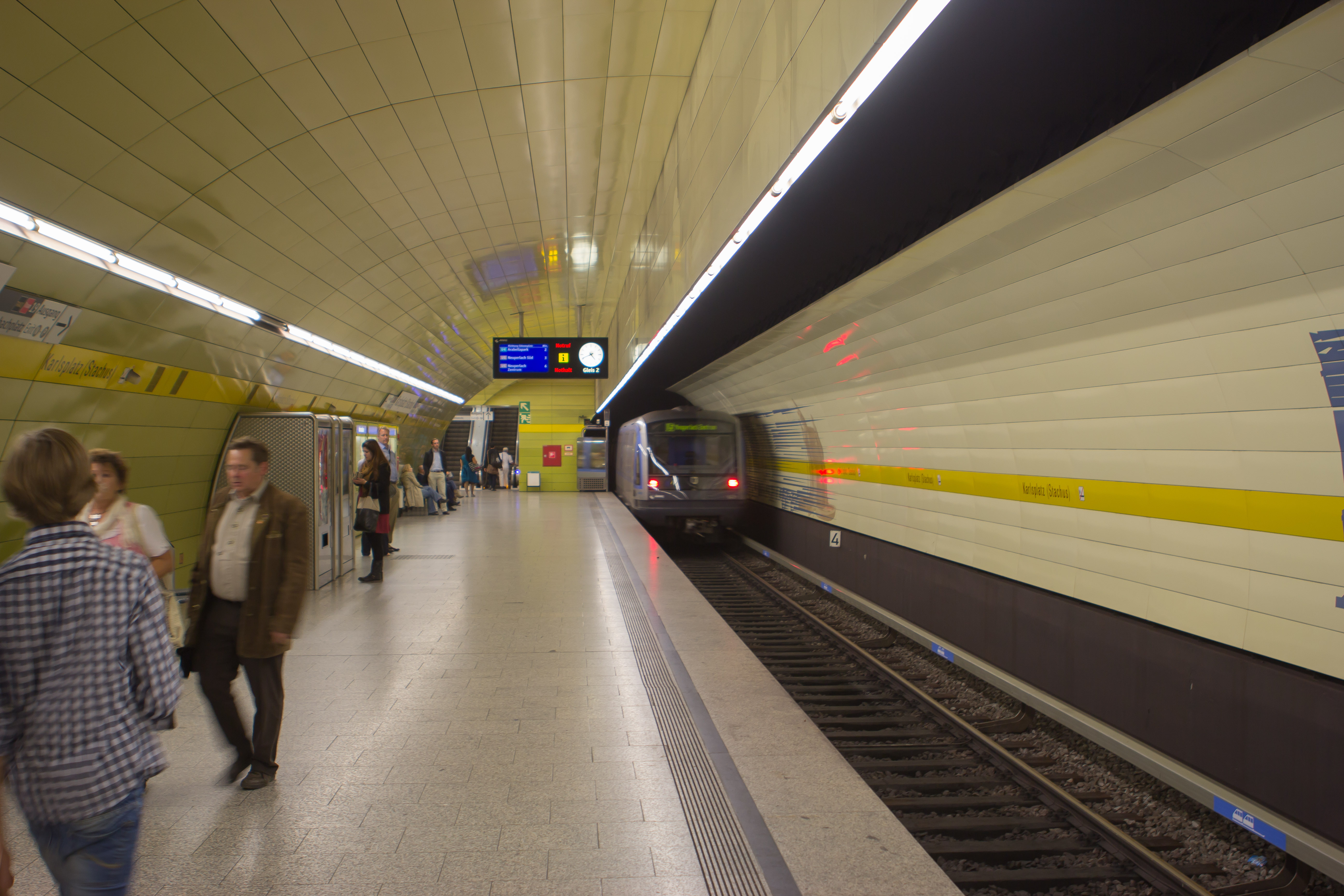
