= Lehel station =

Station of the Munich U-Bahn

Lehel
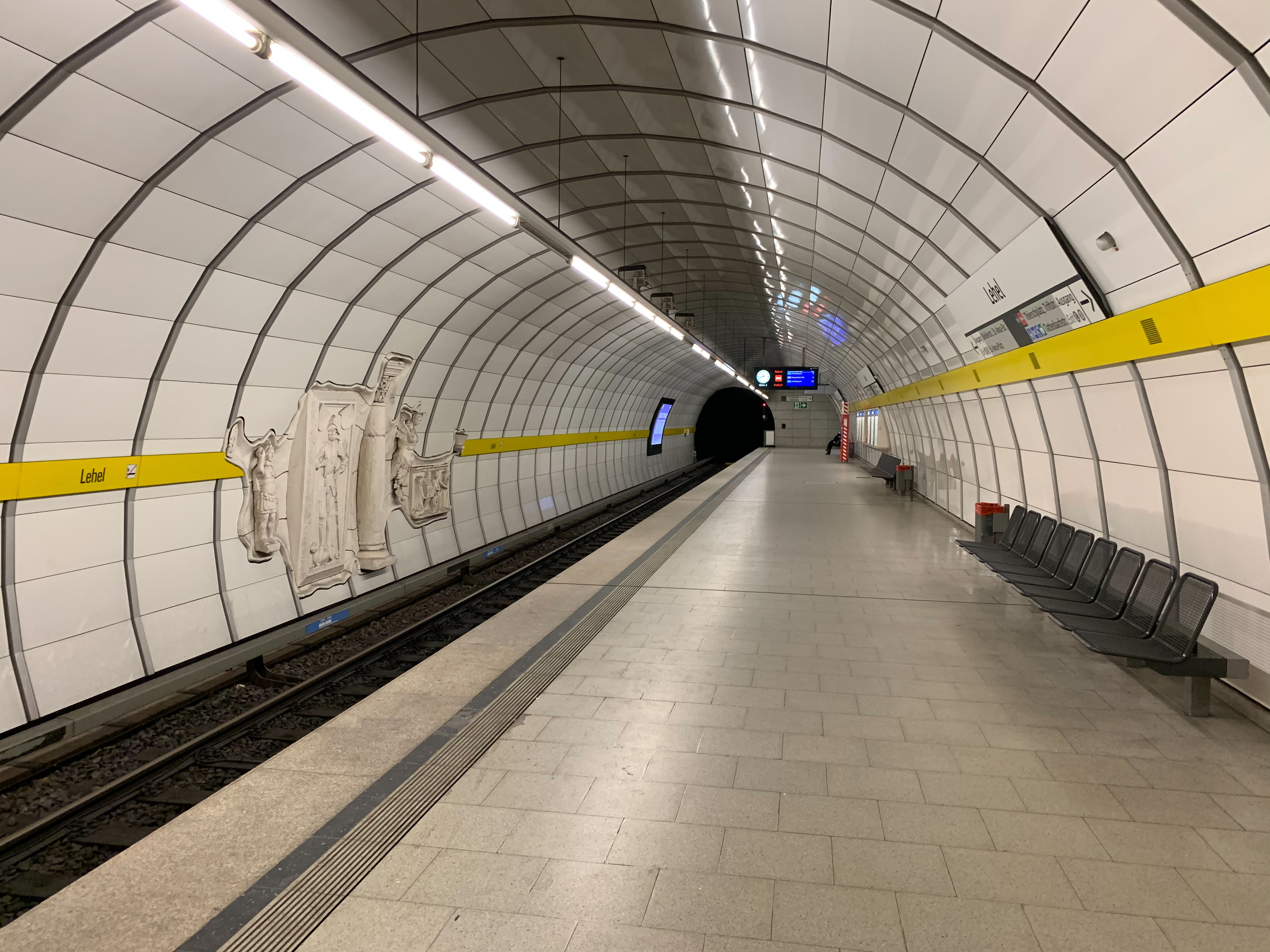

General information
- Location: Altstadt-Lehel; Munich, Germany
- Coordinates: 48°08′22″N 11°35′17″E
- Platforms: 2 bore tunnels with side platform
- Tracks: 2

Construction
- Structure type: Underground
- Accessible: Yes

Other information
- Fare zone: : M

History
- Opened: October 27, 1988

Services
Preceding station	Munich U-Bahn	Following station
Odeonsplatz towards Westendstraße	U4	Max-Weber-Platz towards Arabellapark
Odeonsplatz towards Laimer Platz	U5	Max-Weber-Platz towards Neuperlach Süd
Location

Lehel is a Munich U-Bahn station located centrally in the Lehel quarter of Munich. It is on the U4 and U5 lines between Odeonsplatz to the west and Max-Weber-Platz to the east, and is also served at ground level by tram line 18.

The station has two excavated tunnels with side platforms on the centre line, joined at each end by connecting passages. From these connecting passages there are triple escalators to/from mezzanine levels, which in turn each have flanking exits to ground level with escalators and stairs. At the east end, there are two separate elevators linking the platform with the mezzanine, and the mezzanine with the ground levels. There is also a stairwell at the east end from the platform level to the mezzanine level. The west end exits lead to the west side of Sankt Anna Straße at Sankt Anna Platz; the east end exits lead to Tierschplatz, where the tram 18 stop is located.

Because of a number of museums in the area, at track level there are reproductions of various sculptures embedded in the outside walls along with display cases in the connecting passages. The arched walls and ceilings of each platform tunnel are striped with matte silver metal bands which together with the central lighting strip give the space a bright appearance.
