= Prinzregentenplatz station =

Station of the Munich U-Bahn

Prinzregentenplatz
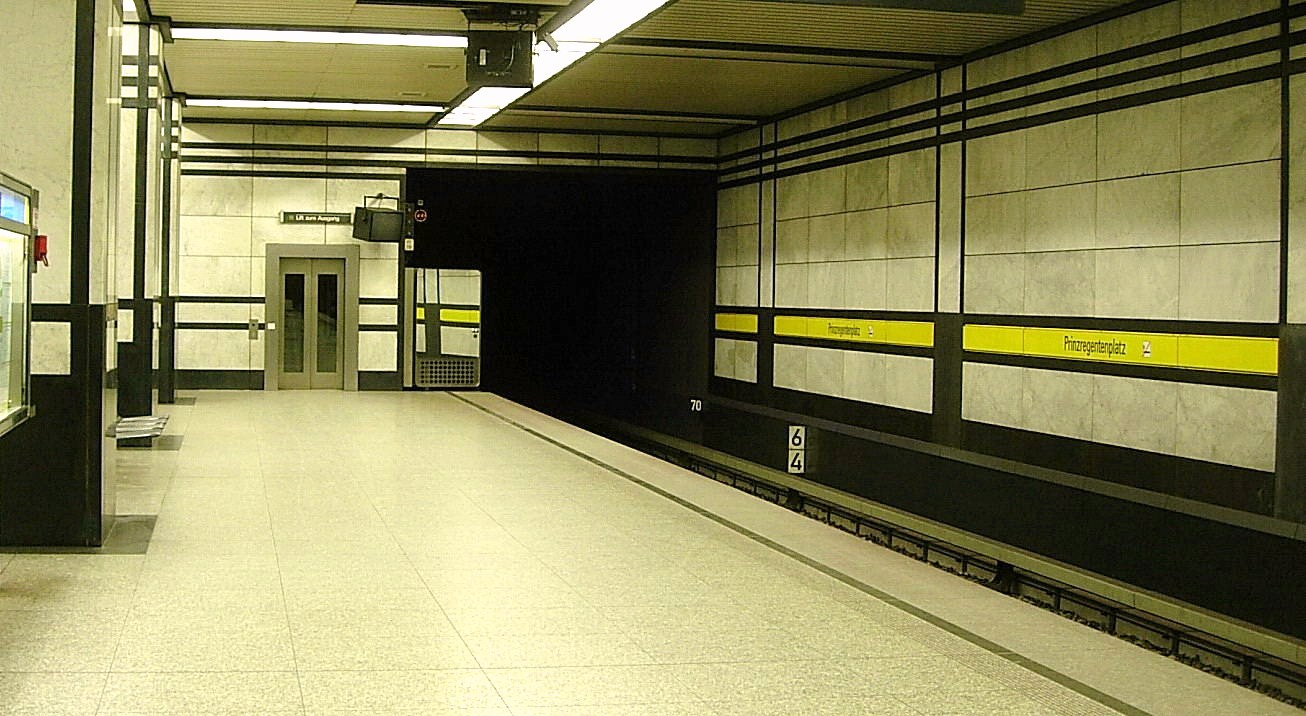

General information
- Location: Prinzregentenplatz, Bogenhausen; Munich, Germany
- Coordinates: 48°08′22″N 11°36′26″E
- Platforms: Island platform
- Tracks: 2

Construction
- Structure type: Underground
- Accessible: Yes

Other information
- Fare zone: : M

History
- Opened: 27 October 1988

Services
Preceding station	Munich U-Bahn	Following station
Max-Weber-Platz towards Westendstraße	U4	Böhmerwaldplatz towards Arabellapark
Location

Prinzregentenplatz is an U-Bahn station in Munich on the U4.

The Prinzregentenplatz is located in Bogenhausen. It was named after Luitpold, Prince Regent of Bavaria.
