= Odeonsplatz station =

Station of the Munich U-Bahn

Odeonsplatz

General information
- Location: Odeonsplatz, Altstadt-Lehel; Munich, Germany
- Coordinates: 48°08′33″N 11°34′39″E
- Platforms: 4

Construction
- Structure type: Underground
- Accessible: Yes

Other information
- Fare zone: : M

Services
Preceding station	Munich U-Bahn	Following station
Marienplatz towards Fürstenried West	U3	Universität towards Moosach
Karlsplatz towards Westendstraße	U4	Lehel towards Arabellapark
Karlsplatz towards Laimer Platz	U5	Lehel towards Neuperlach Süd
Marienplatz towards Klinikum Großhadern	U6	Universität towards Garching-Forschungszentrum
Location

Odeonsplatz is an important U-Bahn interchange station on the northern edge of Munich's Old Town. It is serviced by the, and, lines of the Munich U-Bahn system, with U4, and U5 running in an east-west direction and U3, and U6 running perpendicular in a north-south direction. It is one of the Old Town's principal U-Bahn interchanges, the others being Sendlinger Tor on the southern periphery, Karlsplatz in the west and Marienplatz in the city centre.

The station is also serviced by the Museumsline 100, a bus line that calls at several important museums throughout town. The night service N40 also calls at Odeonsplatz.

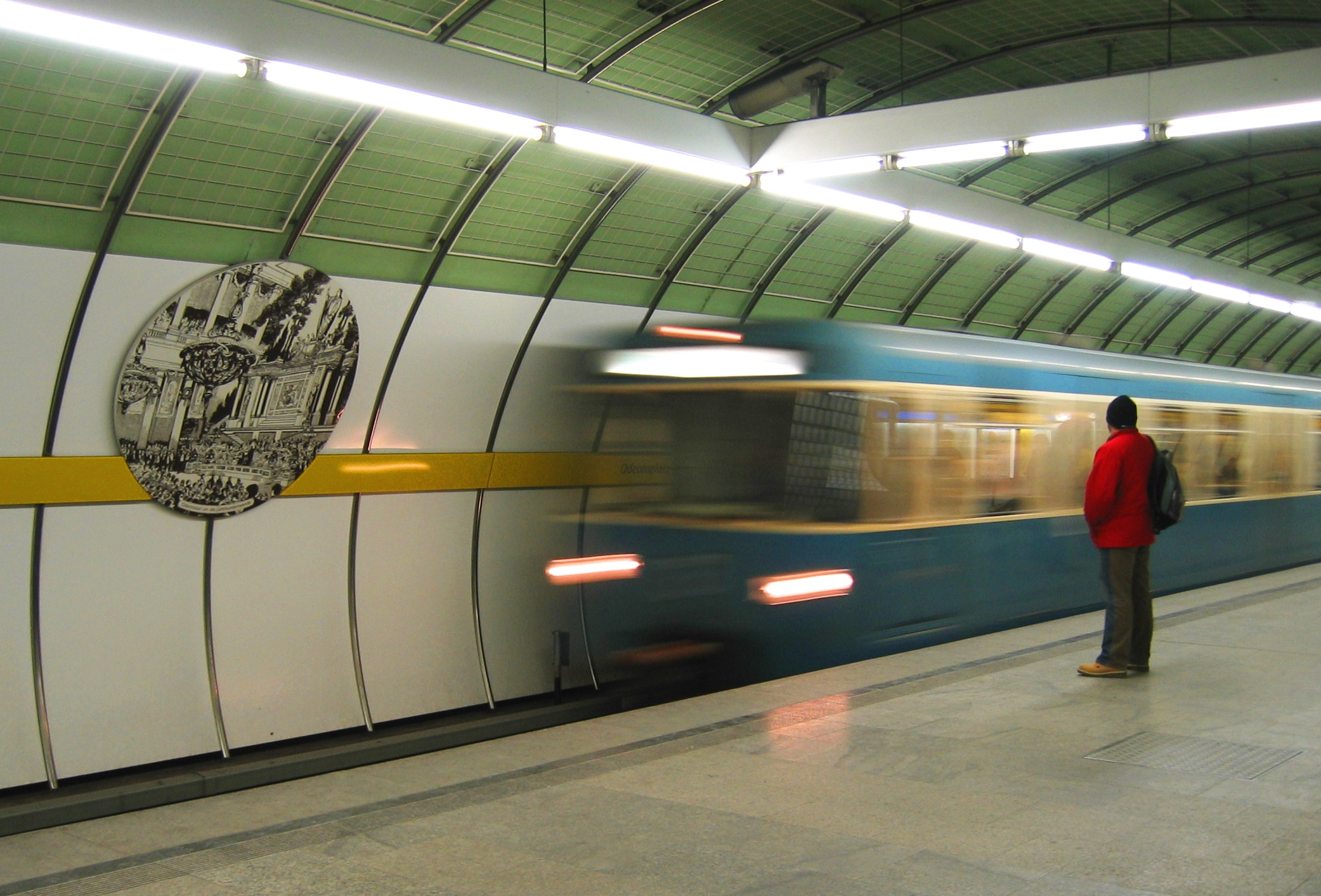
Line 4 and 5 platform

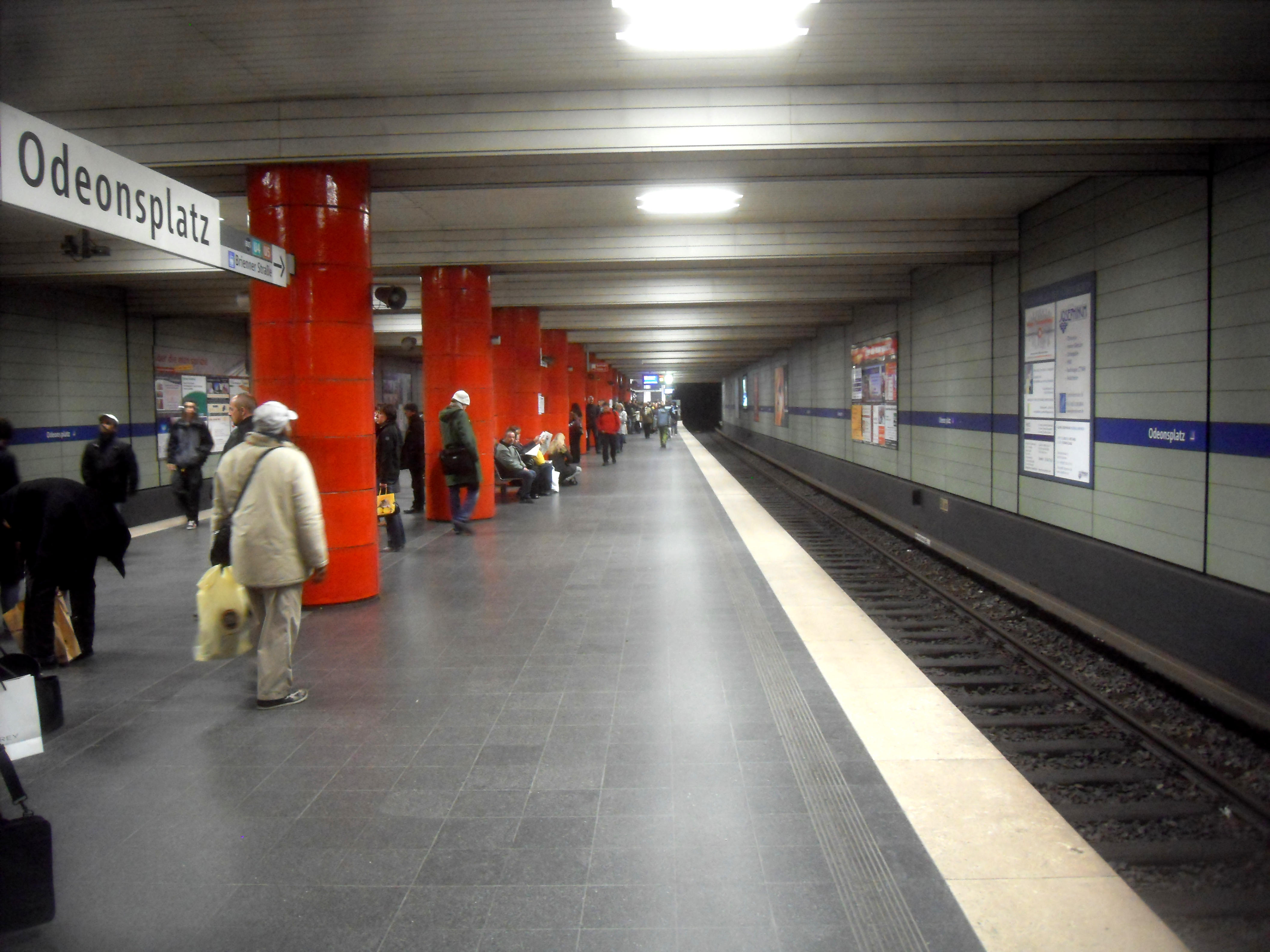
Line 3 and 6 platform

== Places nearby ==
Clockwise, starting in the north

- Odeonsplatz
- Englischer Garten
- Haus der Kunst
- Bavarian State Chancellery
- Hofgarten
- Residenz
- Feldherrnhalle
- Theatinerkirche

== See also ==
- List of Munich U-Bahn stations
