= Prinzregentenstraße (Munich) =

Street in Munich, Germany

Coordinates: 48°08′28″N 11°36′00″E

Prinzregentenstraße, Munich

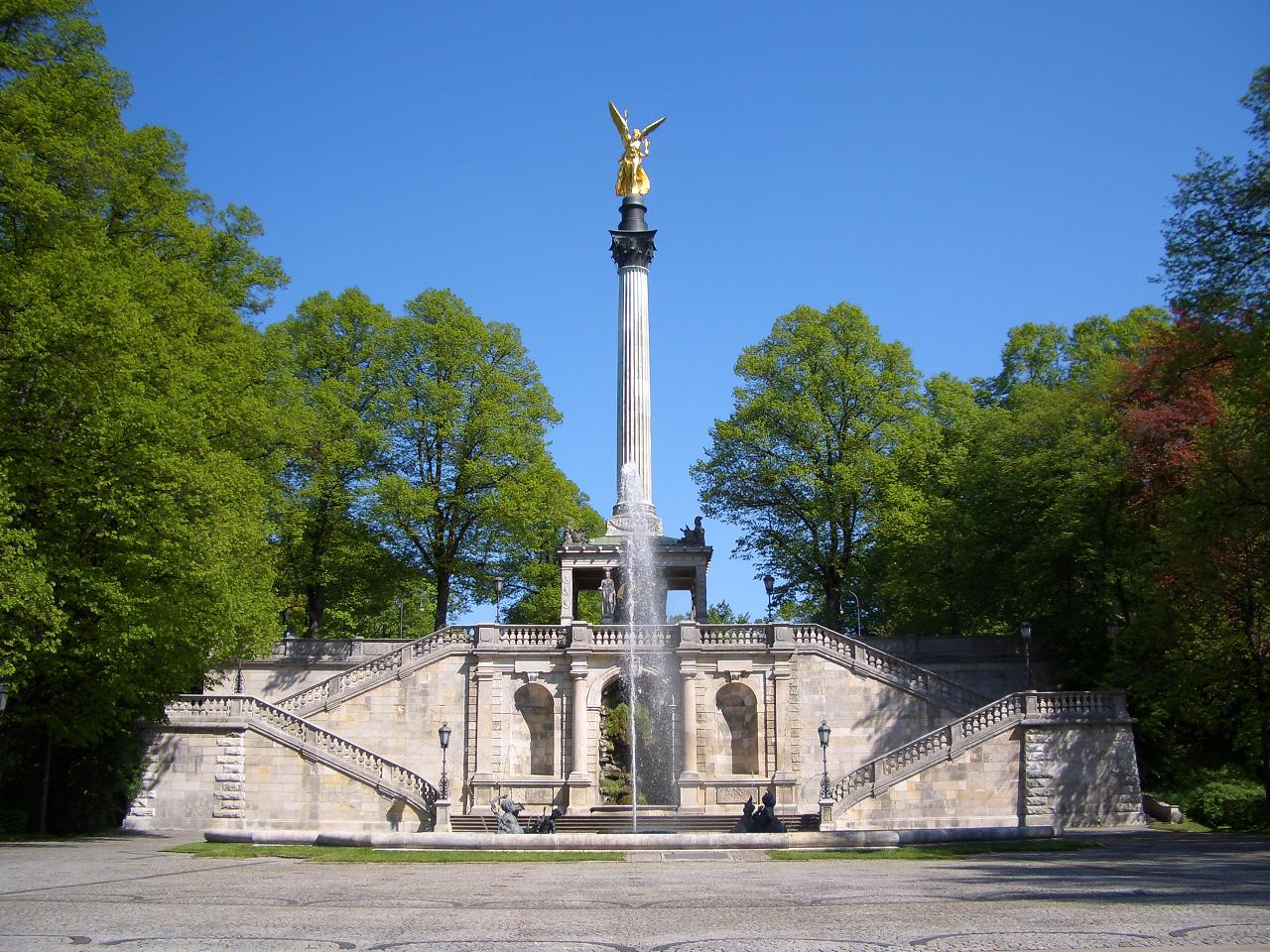
Friedensengel in Prinzregentenstraße

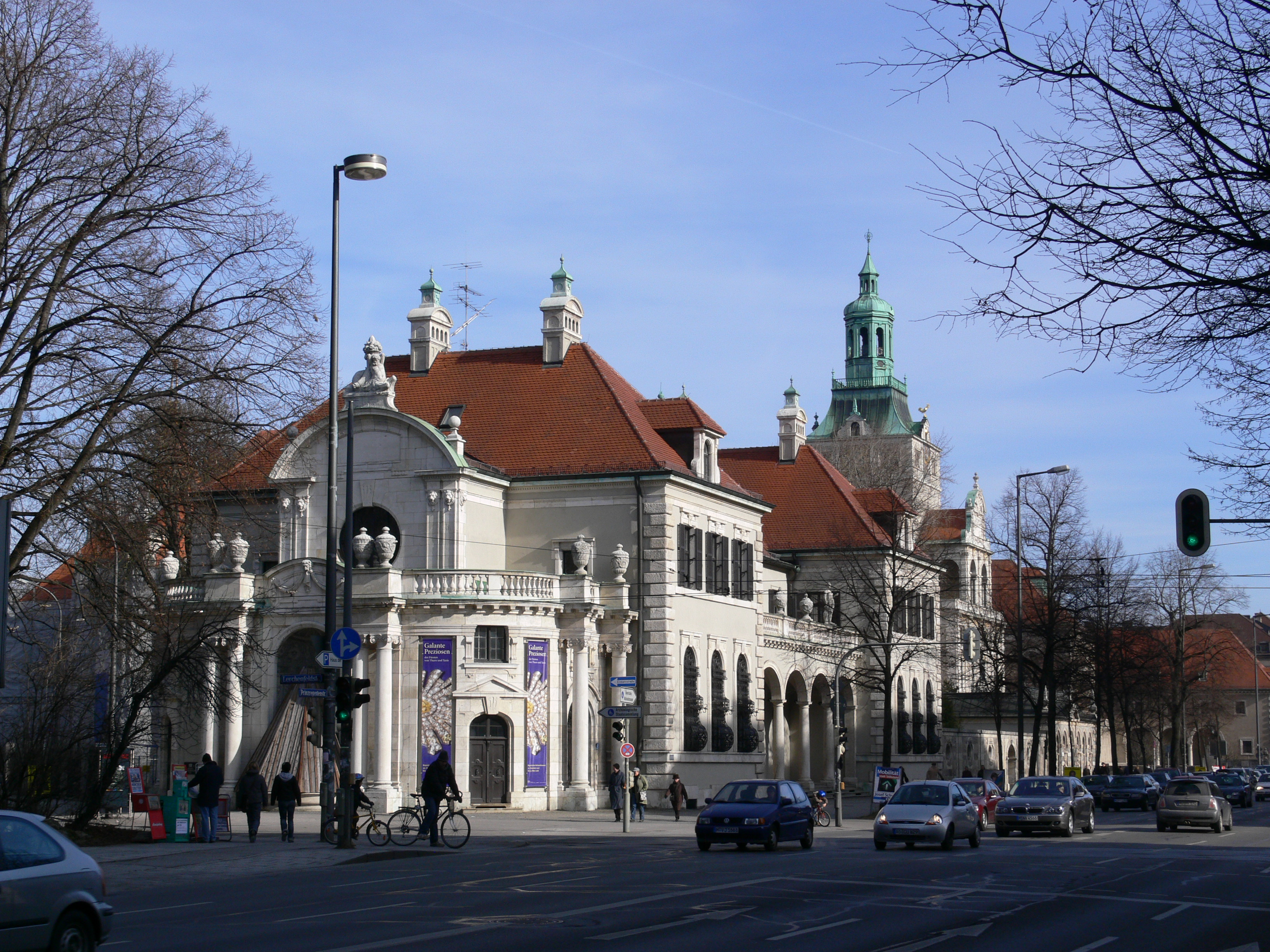
Bavarian National Museum, Prinzregentenstraße

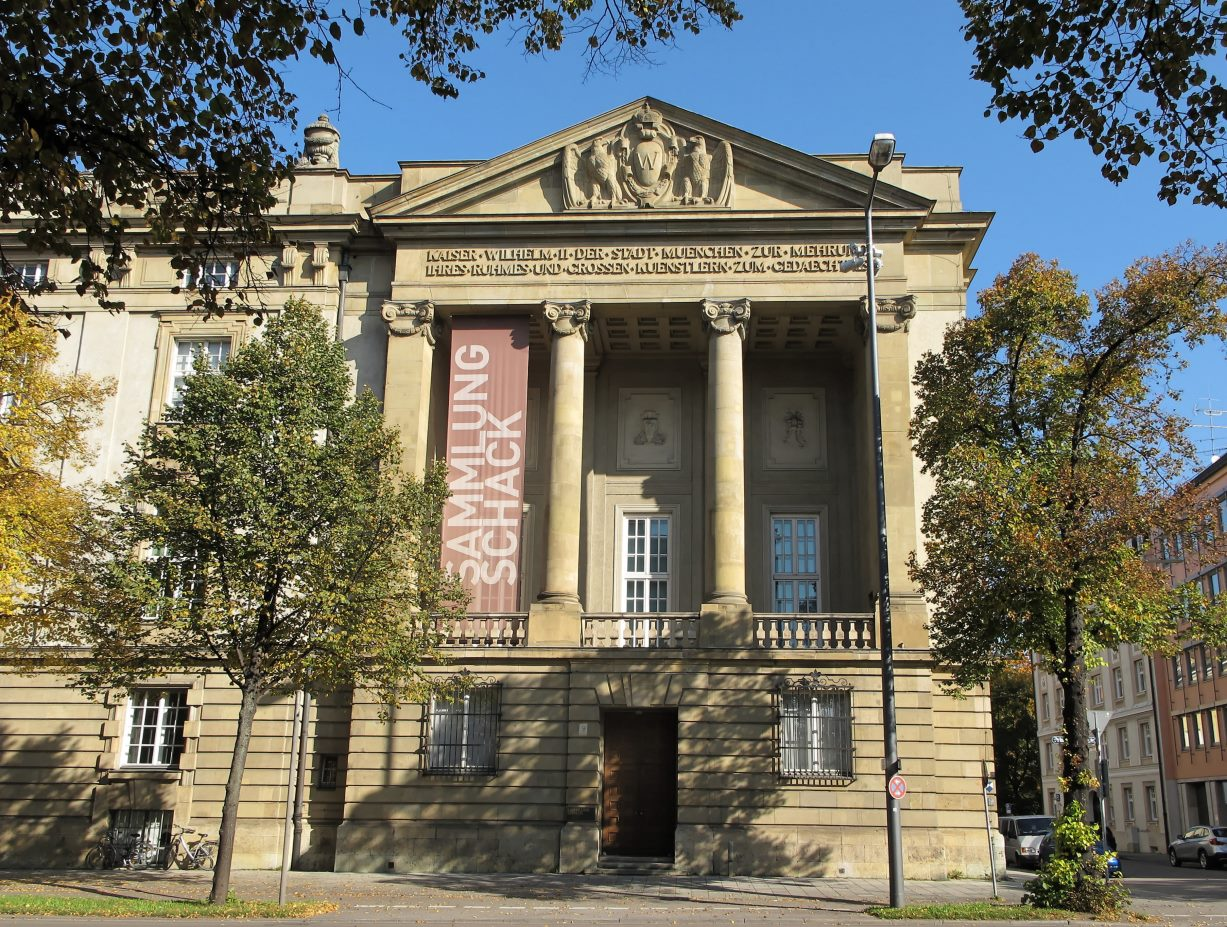
Schackgalerie, Prinzregentenstraße

The Prinzregentenstraße (German: [ˈpʁɪnts.ʁeˌɡɛntənˌʃtʁaːsə], Prince-Regent Street) in Munich is one of four royal avenues and runs parallel to Maximilianstraße and begins at Prinz-Carl-Palais, in the northeastern part of the Old Town. The avenue was constructed from 1891 onwards as a prime address for the middle class during the reign of Luitpold, Prince Regent of Bavaria and is named in his honour. The square in the eastern part of the street is named Prinzregentenplatz.

== Architecture ==
In contrast to Ludwigstraße, the big boulevard of his father Ludwig I and to Maximilianstraße, the boulevard of his brother Maximilian II, Prinzregentenstraße was not planned as an administrative centre with a specially developed style; it was projected as a noble middle-class avenue. Thereby it reflects not only middle-class ideals, but was an expression of the good relation between the citizens, above all of the bourgeoisie and the educated classes, and the house of Wittelsbach. At the same time Prinzregentenstraße demonstrates the prosperity about 1900.

Many museums can be found along the avenue. These include:

- The Bayerisches Nationalmuseum (Bavarian National Museum, designed by Gabriel von Seidl 1894-1900).
- The Schackgalerie (by Max Littmann, 1907).
- the Villa Stuck (1898) of Franz von Stuck which is situated on the eastern side of the Isar river.

In 1891 the steel bridge was built as part of the Prinzregentenstraße after a draft of the architect Friedrich von Thiersch, which was financed by the Prince Regent and named after him. It was decorated by four stone sculptures which symbolized Bavaria, Swabia, Franconia and the Palatinate.

The Prinzregentenstraße crosses the Isar river and circles the Friedensengel (Angel of Peace). The Friedensengel monument commemorates the 25 years of peace following the Franco-Prussian War in 1871. It is a 23m Corinthian colum with a 6m gilded state and was completed in 1899.

In the winter the Prinzregentstadion on the eastern side serves for ice skating, for the rest of the year the stadium is transformed into an open-air swimming pool. The Prinzregententheater (by Max Littmann, 1901), an important theatre of the city, is at Prinzregentenplatz further to the east. In the easternmost part of the Prinzregentenstraße the church St. Gabriel was built in 1925–1926 by Otho Orlando Kurz and Eduard Herbert.

== Third Reich ==
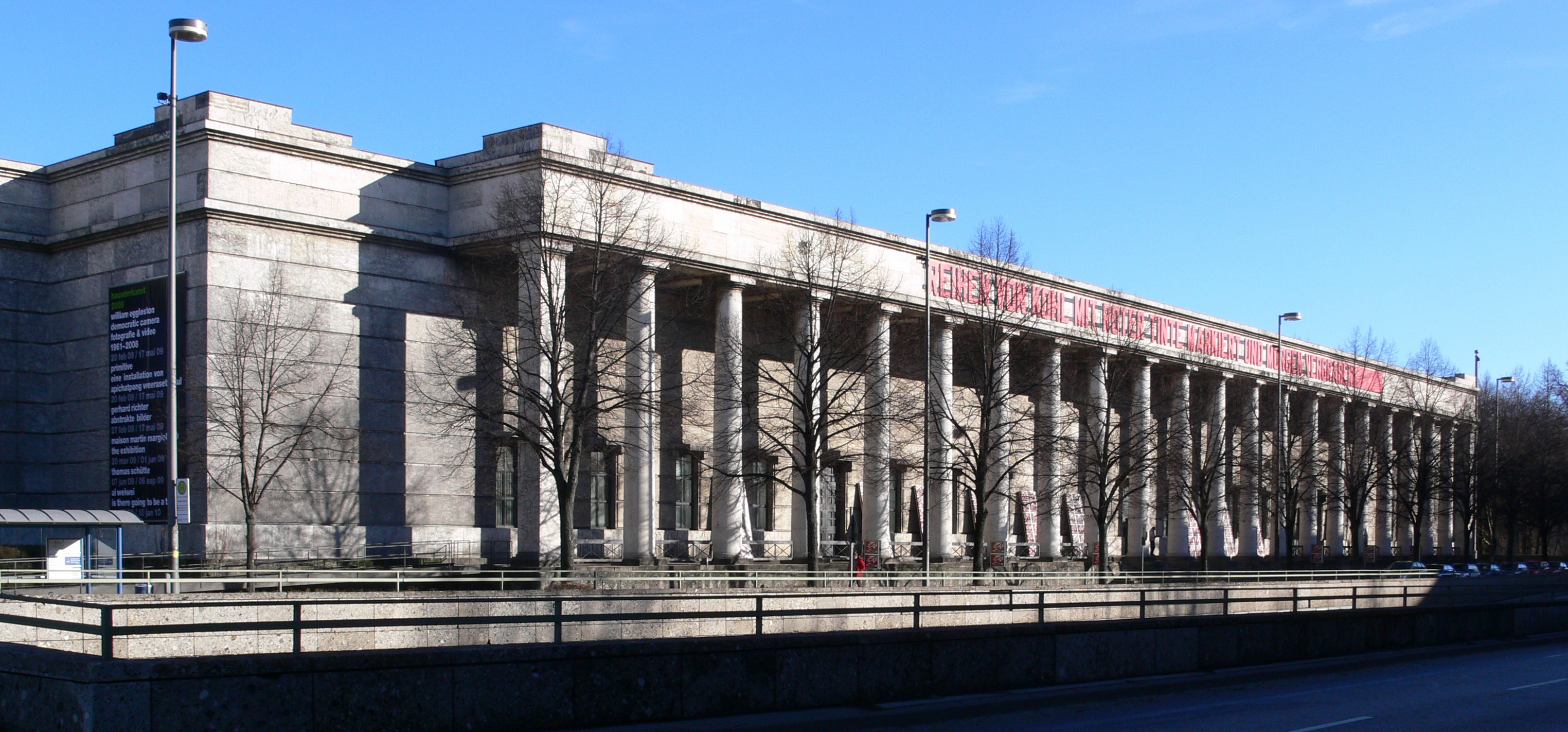
Haus der Kunst

The Haus der Kunst ("House of Art"", 1933-1937 by Paul Ludwig Troost) was built under the Nazi Party era. With this building, the Prinzregentenstraße was altered by the Nazi Party, as was the Brienner Straße and the Ludwigstraße to transform the royal avenues according to Nazi ideas of power and political significance.

The former Luftgaukommando South opposite to the National Museum was built 1937/38 during the Third Reich and designed by German Bestelmeyer. The three-storey central building (250 meters long) is set back from the street and today serves as Bavarian Ministry of Economy. In the east it is flanked by a five-story tower, to the west by a four-storey front building.

The tower-like, elongated bunker close to St. Gabriel also belongs to the Third Reich constructions in Munich. Today it serves as Kunstbunker Tumulka.

Adolf Hitler's private apartment in Munich from 1929 was located at 16 Prinzregentenplatz. It was his official private address and, beginning in 1929, the address in which he lived with his niece, Geli Raubal, who later committed suicide. Today, Hitler's second-floor apartment houses the Munich Financing Office for the state of Bavaria and Hitler's room is currently used for storage and not open to the public.

== See also ==
- Prinzregentenplatz (Munich U-Bahn)
