= Munich Marienplatz station =

Station of the Munich S-Bahn and U-Bahn

München Marienplatz
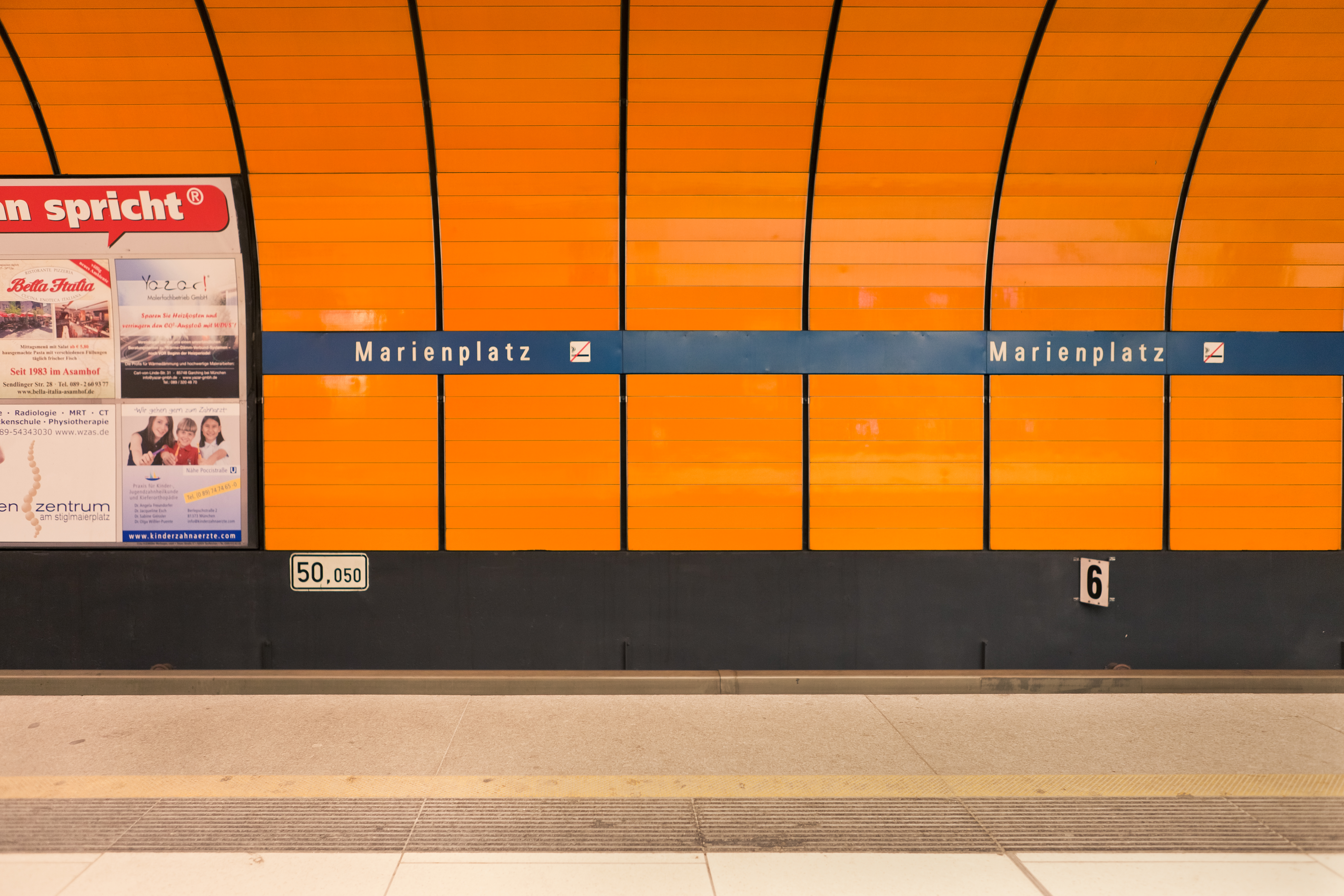

General information
- Location: Marienplatz, Munich, Bavaria; Germany
- Coordinates: 48°08′14″N 11°34′31″E
- Lines: S-Bahn trunk line (KBS 999)
- Platforms: S-Bahn: split platform, both levels with Spanish solution; U-Bahn: 2 side platforms
- Train operators: S-Bahn München
- Connections: 132

Construction
- Accessible: Yes

Other information
- Station code: 4240
- DS100 code: MMP
- IBNR: 8004135
- Category: 3
- Fare zone: : M
- Website: stationsdatenbank.de; www.bahnhof.de

Passengers
- 175,400 daily

Services
Preceding station	Munich S-Bahn	Following station
Karlsplatz towards Freising or Flughafen	S1	Isartor towards Leuchtenbergring
Karlsplatz towards Petershausen or Altomünster	S2	Isartor towards Erding
Karlsplatz towards Mammendorf	S3	Isartor towards Holzkirchen
Karlsplatz towards Geltendorf	S4	Isartor towards Ebersberg
Karlsplatz towards Weßling	S5	Isartor towards Kreuzstraße
Karlsplatz towards Tutzing	S6	Isartor towards Ebersberg
Karlsplatz towards Herrsching	S8	Isartor towards Flughafen
Preceding station	Munich U-Bahn	Following station
Sendlinger Tor towards Fürstenried West	U3	Odeonsplatz towards Moosach
Sendlinger Tor towards Klinikum Großhadern	U6	Odeonsplatz towards Garching-Forschungszentrum
Location

Munich Marienplatz is an important stop on the Munich S-Bahn and U-Bahn network, located under the square of the same name in Munich's city centre. The S-Bahn lines S1, S2, S3, S4, S5, S6 and S8 intersect with the U-Bahn lines U3 and U6. The station is one of the most frequently used stations in the network, with up to 24,400 people transferring and 8,000 passengers entering or exiting each hour. In 2007, 175,400 people used the station daily on weekdays, including entries, exits and transfers.

== History ==
In October 1966 construction was started, finishing in October 1971 as part of the new S-Bahn network for the 1972 Summer Olympics. Until early 2003 there were almost no further refurbishments done at the station. From 2003 to 2006, the platforms of the U-Bahn were widened to expand passenger capacity and were lifted by 4 cm to secure same-level boarding.

The increase in traffic and the new Allianz Arena also required a larger capacity of this already overcrowded pivotal transfer station. New pedestrian tunnels were built, which provide more room for passengers transferring from and to the S-Bahn. They lie parallel to the existing platforms and are connected to them by 11 portals. At the south end, they meet the transverse tunnel, where the escalators to the S-Bahn platforms are located.

Under the Zweite Stammstrecke ("Second main line") tunnel project, Marienplatz station is to be connected to a second station further north, Marienhof, via the enlarged subway access tunnels on the fourth level.

Parts the music video for Four Out of Five by the Arctic Monkeys features the station as Alex Turner walks down a tunnel called the U-Bahn.

== Station layout ==
Marienplatz station is completely underground and consists of four levels:

- First Level: The first level sprawls underneath the Marienplatz, with exits on all four ends of the square (clockwise from north-west: Weinstraße, north-east: Fischbrunnen/Tal, south-east: Rindermarkt, south-west: Sendlinger Straße). It contains a shopping passage, an MVG service centre, ticket booths, and the entrances to the S- and U-Bahn.
- Second Level: The second level contains the eastbound S-Bahn track with two side platforms, in Spanish solution. The larger platform is for embarking, the smaller for disembarking and connection to the subways. The platforms are each 210 metres long and 96 cm high. The Olympic Park station in Sydney copies this arrangement, albeit with two tracks and four platforms.
- Third Level: The third level contains the westbound S-Bahn track with two side platforms, also laid out in Spanish solution.
- Fourth Level: The fourth level, accessible directly from all three levels, contains the two U-Bahn tracks on two side platforms connected to the rest of the station by wide newly built access tunnels.

== The services ==
=== S-Bahn ===
All S-Bahn lines service Marienplatz, except. Most lines service Marienplatz in 20 minute intervals, except the lines, and, which run every 10 minutes during rush-hours. This equals a train every 2–4 minutes per direction.

=== U-Bahn ===
The U-Bahn services Marienplatz with 3-10 min intervals in off-peak hours, and every 2-3 min during rush hours.

== Gallery ==
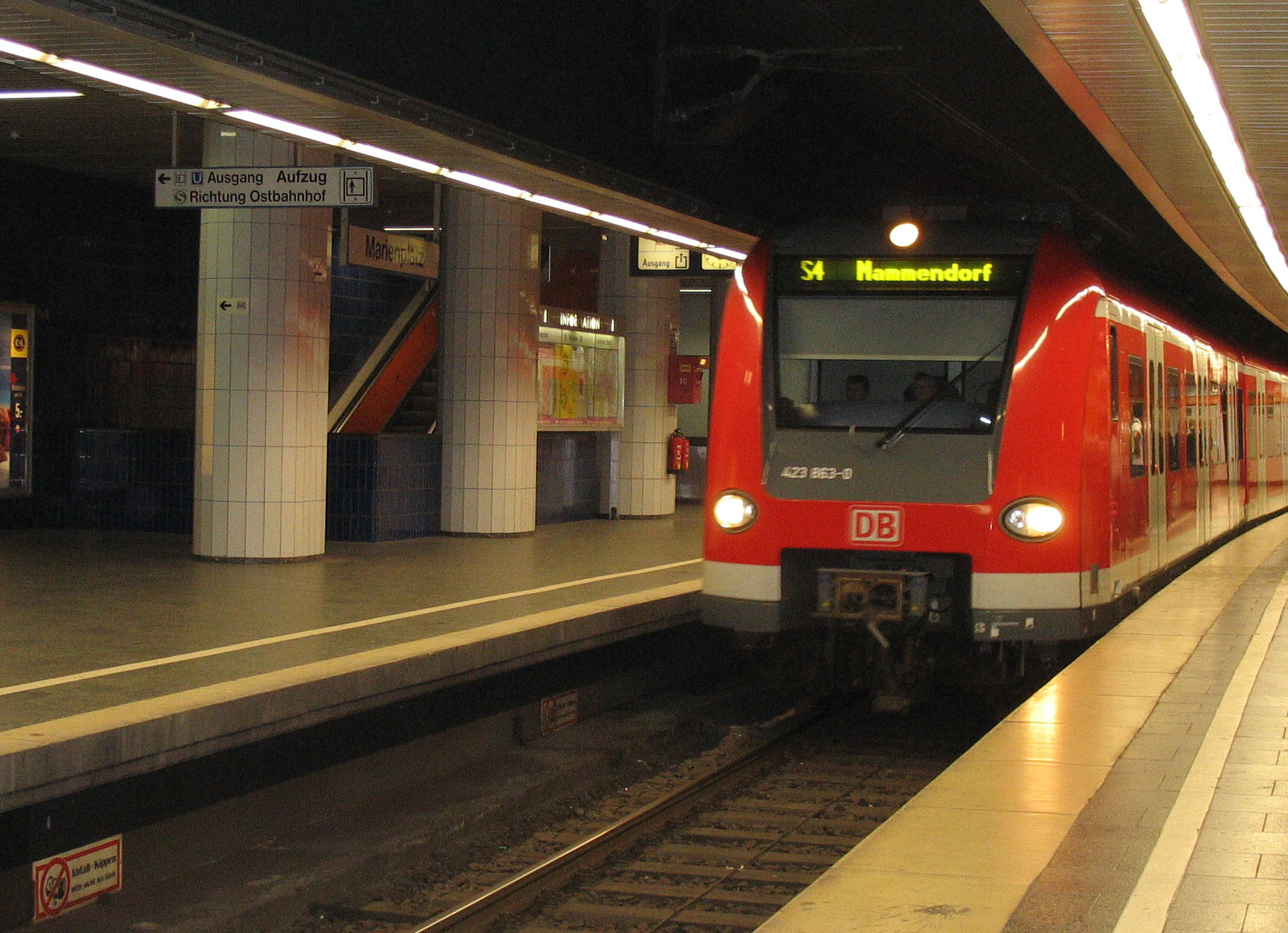
S-Bahn train at Marienplatz

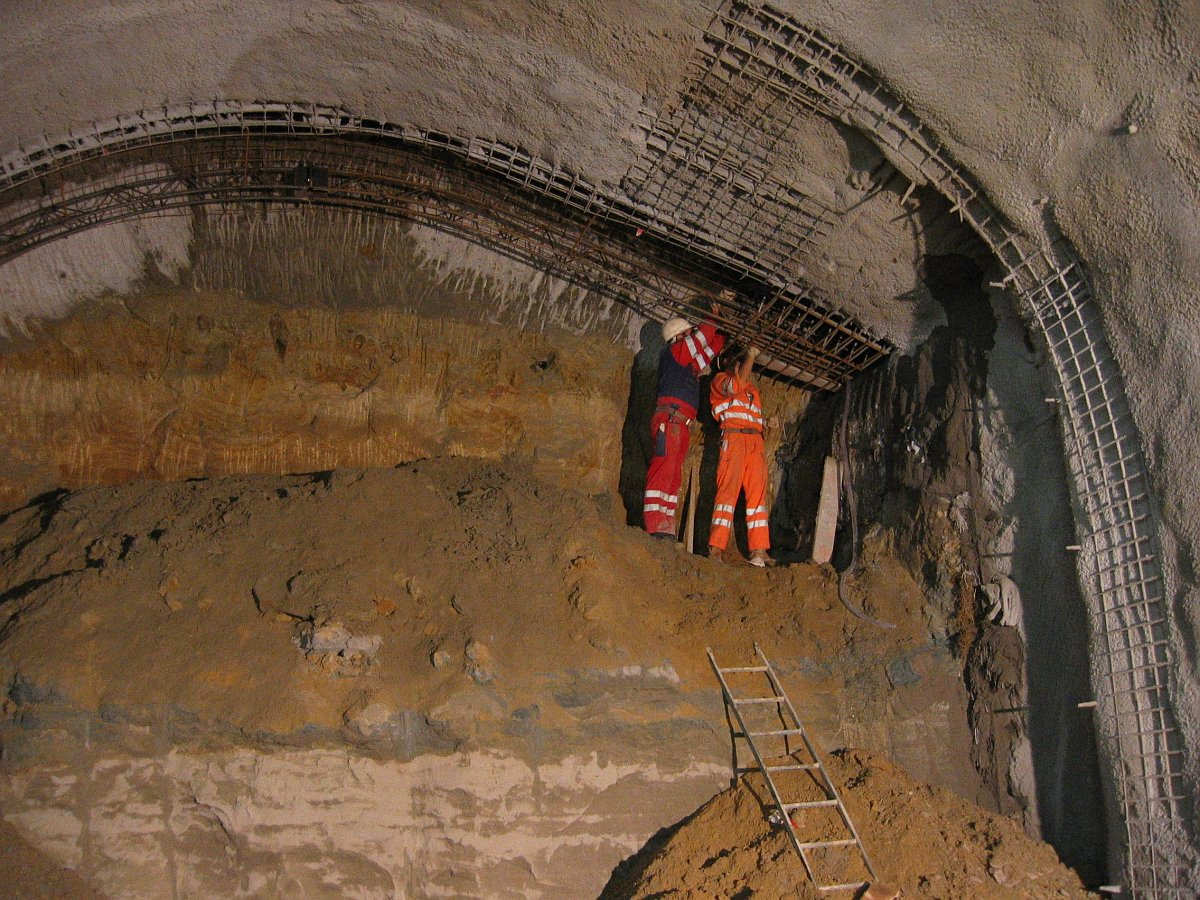
Construction work for U-Bahn extension

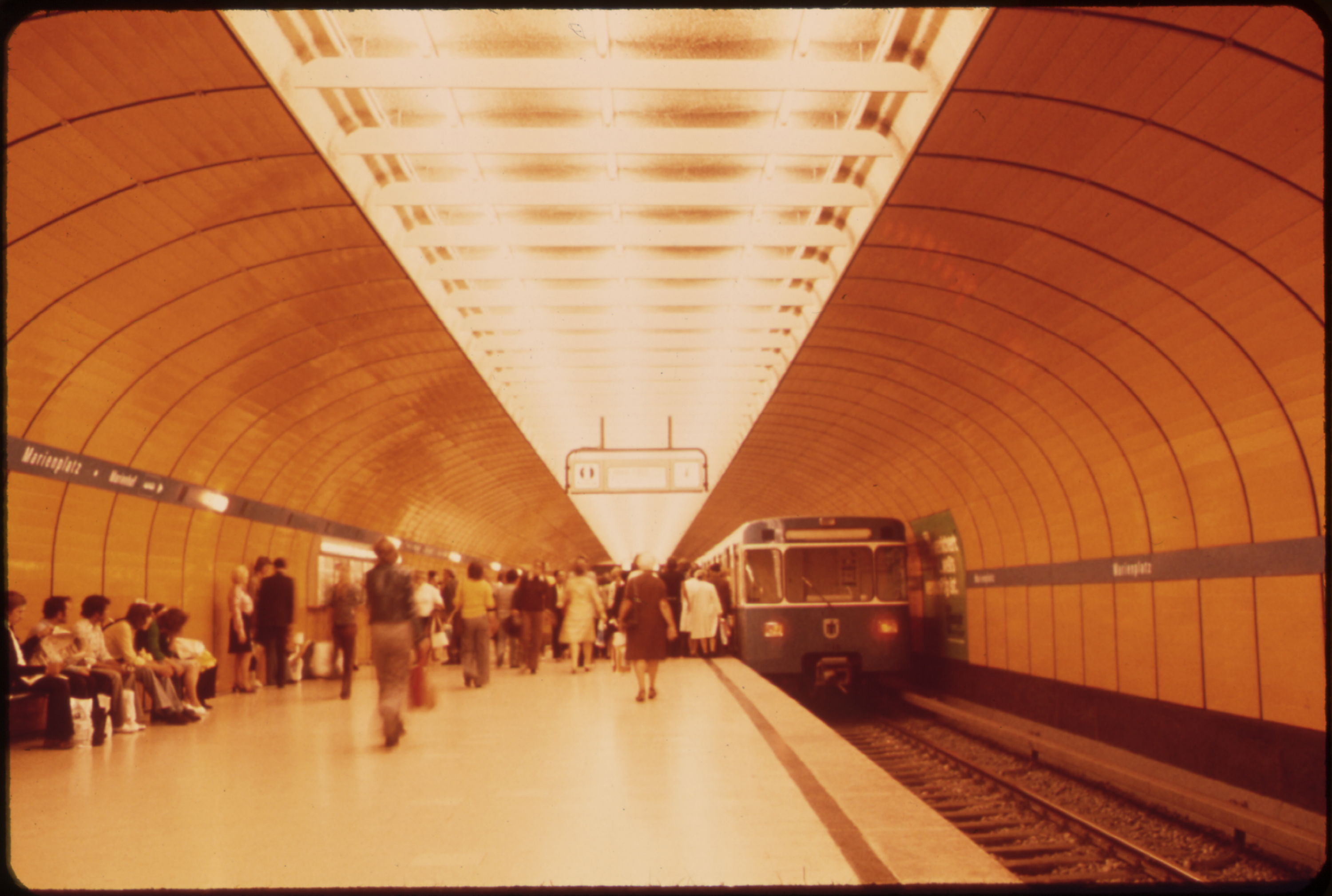
1973 photo

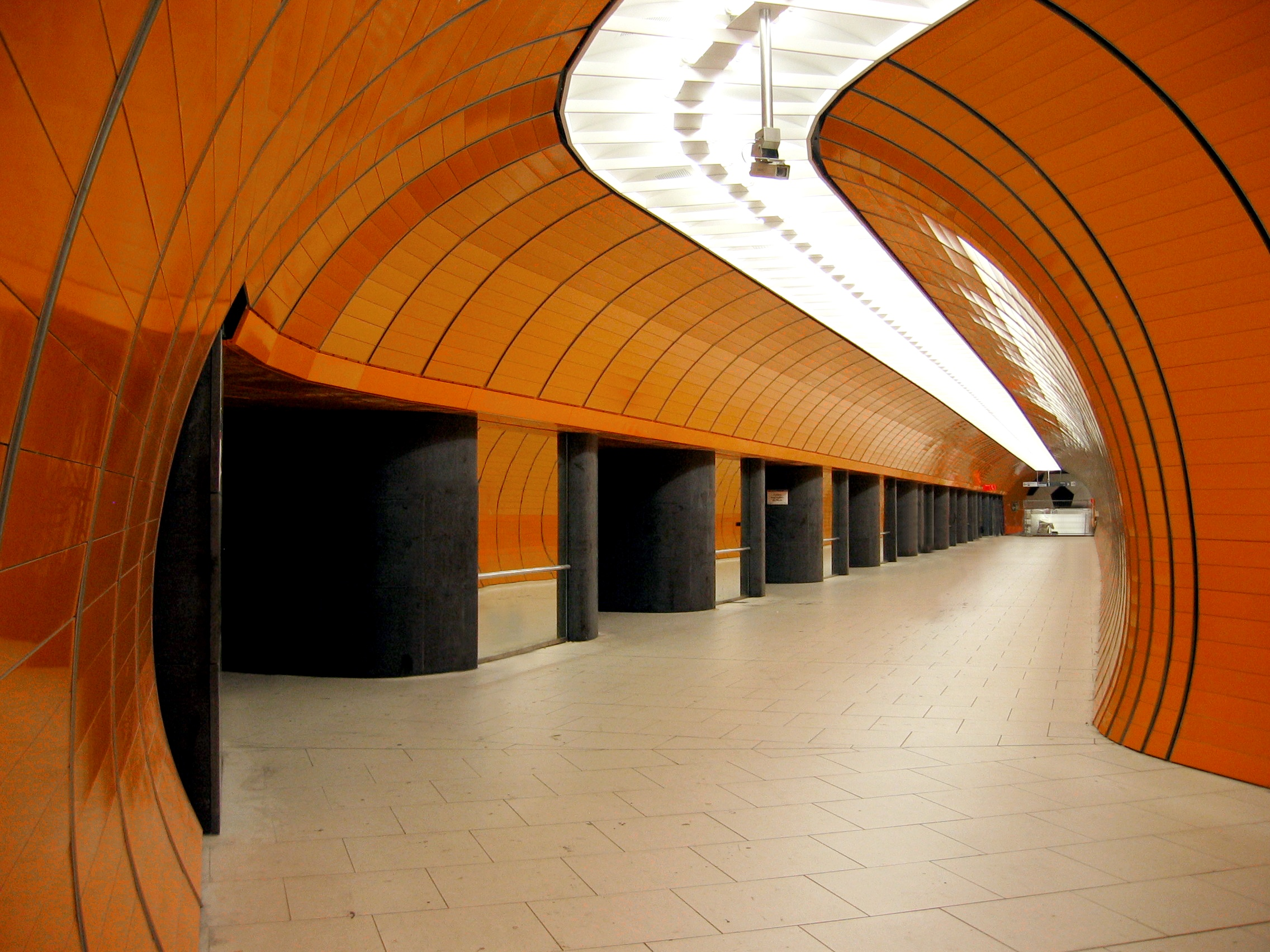
U-Bahn level with extension tunnel
