= Friedenheimer Straße station =

Station of the Munich U-Bahn

Friedenheimer Straße
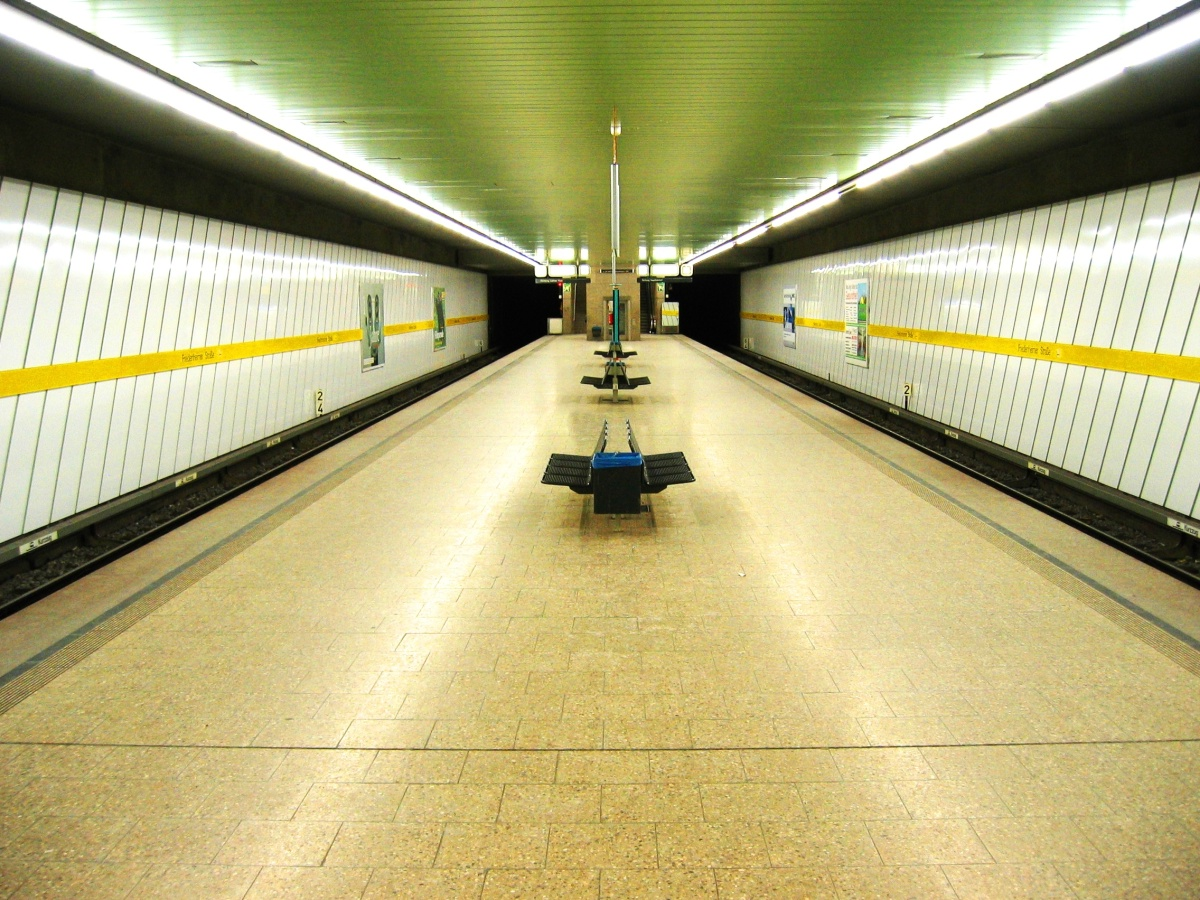
- Friedenheimer Straße station platform

General information
- Location: Germany
- Coordinates: 48°08′06″N 11°30′40″E
- Operator: Münchner Verkehrsgesellschaft
- Line: U5
- Platforms: 1 island platform
- Tracks: 2

History
- Opened: 24 March 1988; 38 years ago

Services
Preceding station	Munich U-Bahn	Following station
Laimer Platz Terminus	U5	Westendstraße towards Neuperlach Süd
Location

Friedenheimer Straße is an U-Bahn station in Munich on the U5.

== Lines ==
The station lies on Stammstrecke 3 and is served by Line U5.

== History ==
The station opened on March 24, 1988 as part of Line U5's extension from Westendstraße station to Laimer Platz station.
