= Westendstraße station =

Station of the Munich U-Bahn

Westendstraße
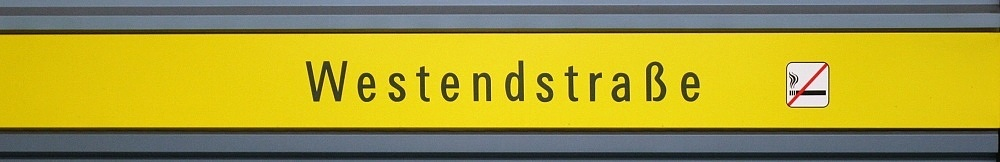
- Westendstraße station sign at the platform.

General information
- Location: Sendling-Westpark; Munich, Germany
- Coordinates: 48°08′05″N 11°31′13″E
- Platforms: Island platform
- Tracks: 2

Construction
- Structure type: Underground
- Accessible: Yes

Other information
- Fare zone: : M

Services
Preceding station	Munich U-Bahn	Following station
Terminus	U4	Heimeranplatz towards Arabellapark
Friedenheimer Straße towards Laimer Platz	U5	Heimeranplatz towards Neuperlach Süd
Location
- Location within Bavaria Location within Germany Location within Europe

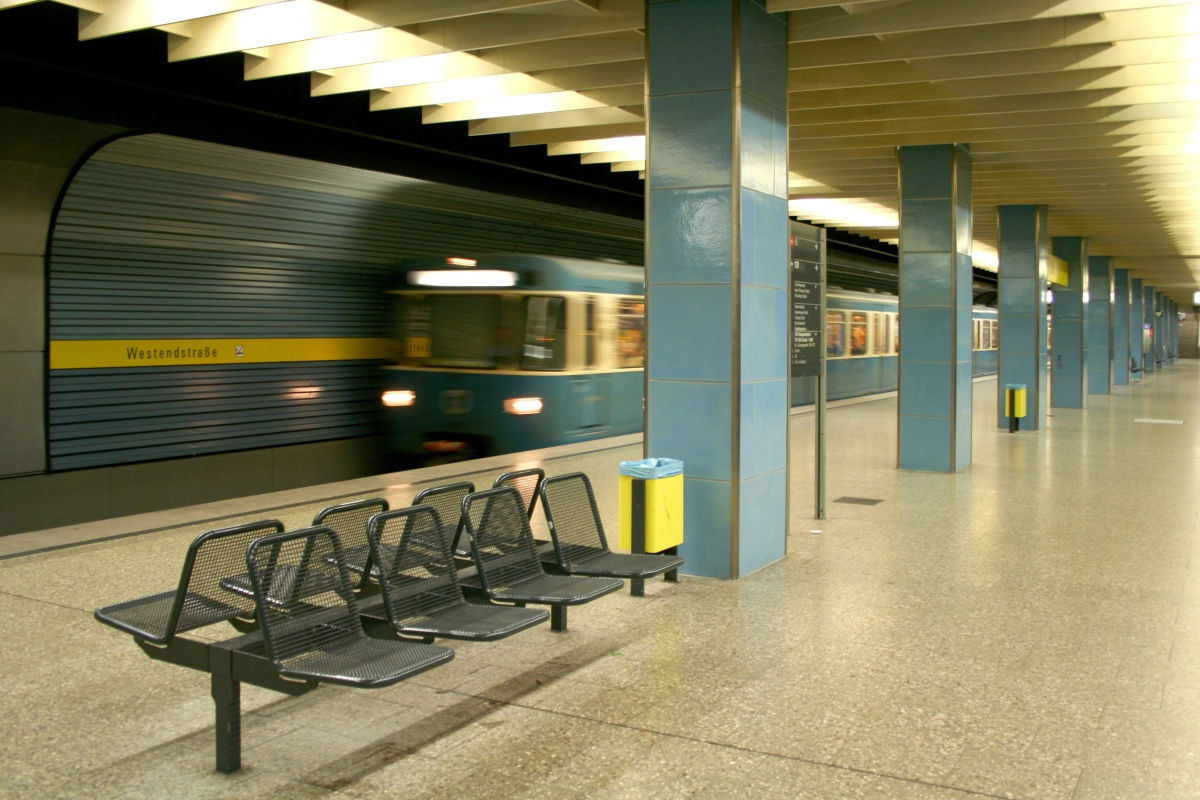
U-Bahnhof Westendstraße

Westendstraße is an U-Bahn station in Munich on the U4 and U5 lines of the Munich U-Bahn system. This is now at certain times the terminus of the U4, since its route was shortened from terminating at Laimer Platz. In rush hour and in general during the holidays it already ends at the Theresienwiese, and in the evenings at the Odeonsplatz.

== See also ==
- List of Munich U-Bahn stations
