= Laimer Platz station =

Station of the Munich U-Bahn

Coordinates: 48°08′07″N 11°30′14″E

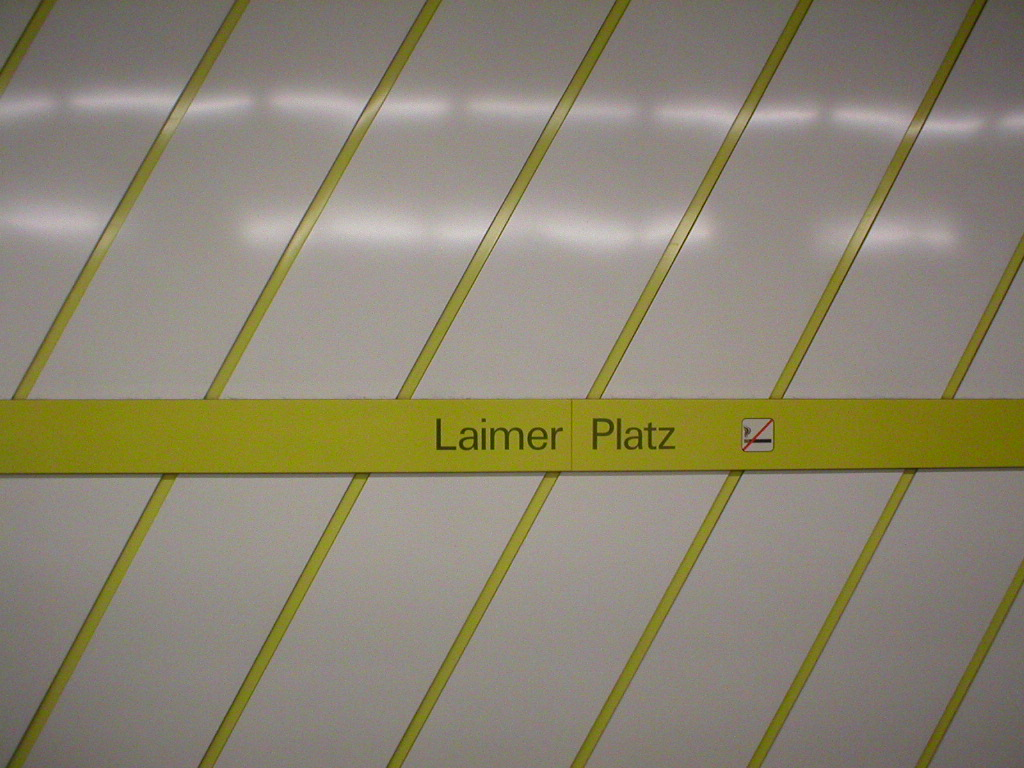
Laimer Platz sign at the platform.

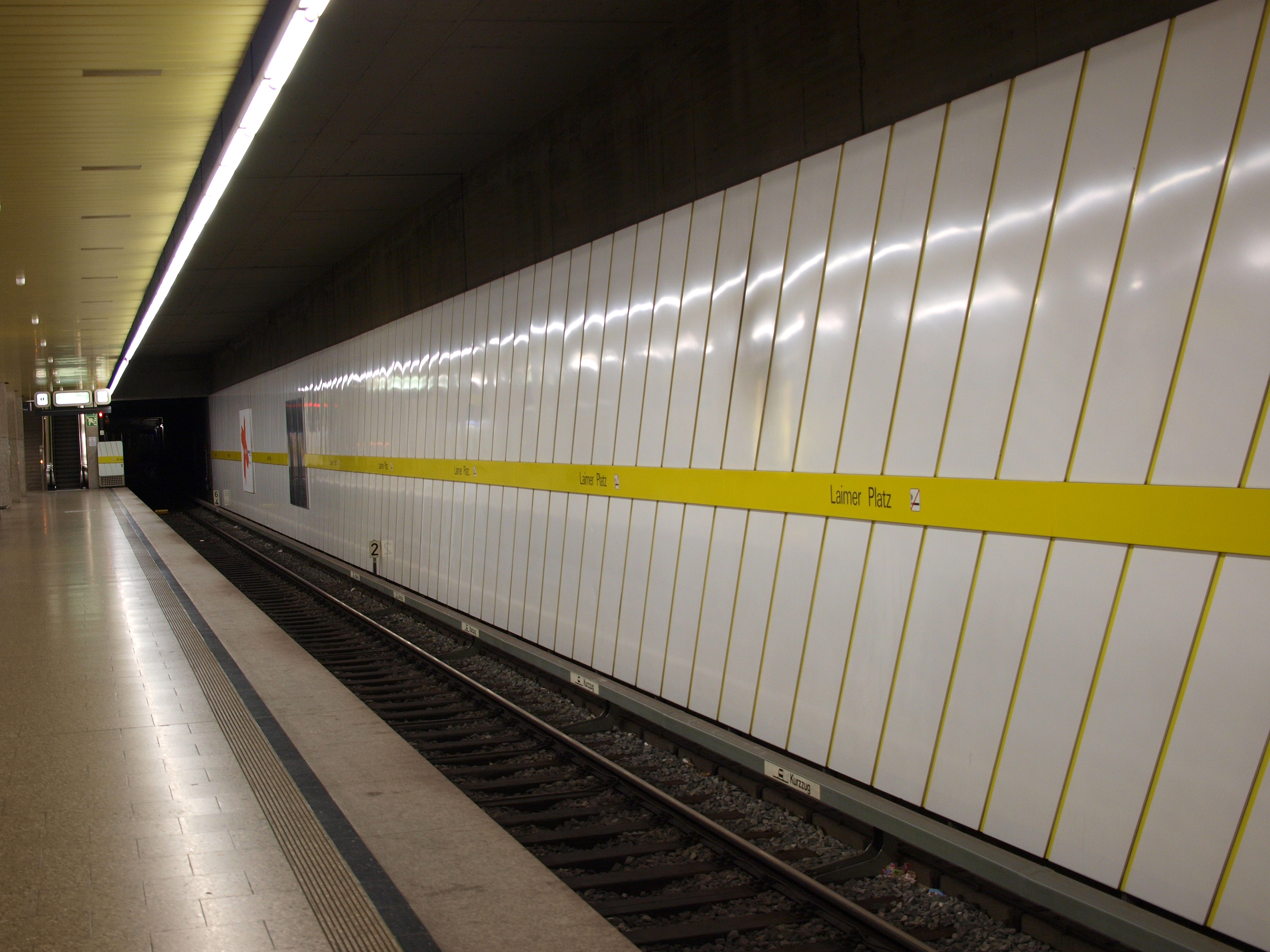
Laimer Platz platform.

Laimer Platz is the last U-Bahn station in Munich on the U5 line of the Munich U-Bahn system, serving as the eastern terminus.

== See also ==
- List of Munich U-Bahn stations

Preceding station	Munich U-Bahn	Following station
Terminus	U5	Friedenheimer Straße towards Neuperlach Süd
