= Arabellapark station =

Station of the Munich U-Bahn

Arabellapark
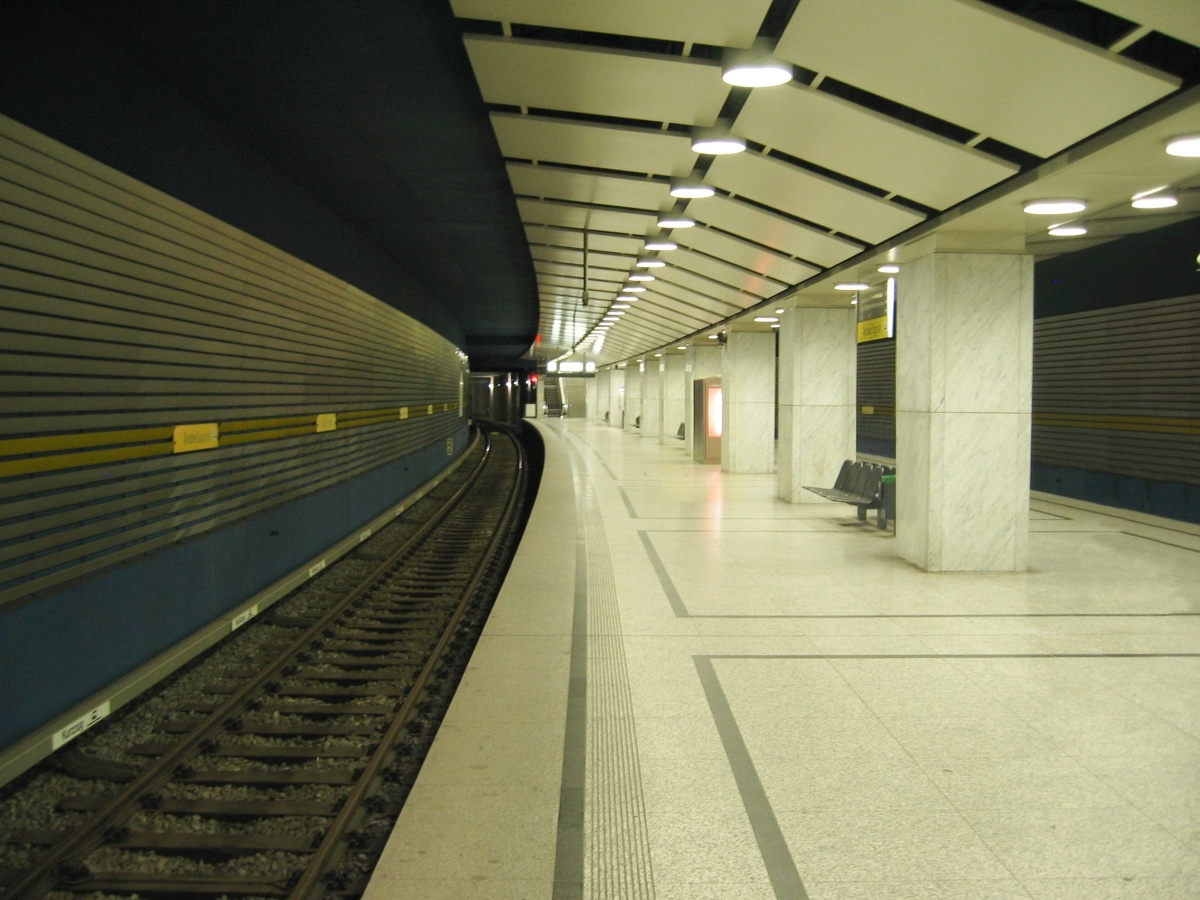

General information
- Location: Englschalkinger Straße, Bogenhausen; Munich, Germany
- Coordinates: 48°09′13″N 11°37′18″E
- Platforms: Island platform
- Tracks: 2
- Connections: 150, 183, 184, 185, 187, X205

Construction
- Structure type: Underground
- Accessible: Yes

Other information
- Fare zone: : M

History
- Opened: 27 October 1988

Services
Preceding station	Munich U-Bahn	Following station
Richard-Strauss-Straße towards Westendstraße	U4	Terminus
Location

Arabellapark is a Munich U-Bahn station in Bogenhausen borough. It is the eastern terminus of the U4 line. Arabellapark station is located in the Arabellapark district of Bogenhausen, a large housing and commercial district developed during the 1970s. It serves as an important bus interchange station for buses servicing Bogenhausen. It is the terminus of bus lines 150, 183, 184, 185, 187 and MVV-Expressbus X205

== Extension plans ==
There are plans to extend the U4 from Arabellapark towards the Englschalking S-Bahn station in the eastern quarter of Bogenhausen. However, these plans have been put on hold due to budget constraints. The city has instead extended Tram Lines 16 and 37 towards Unterföhring.

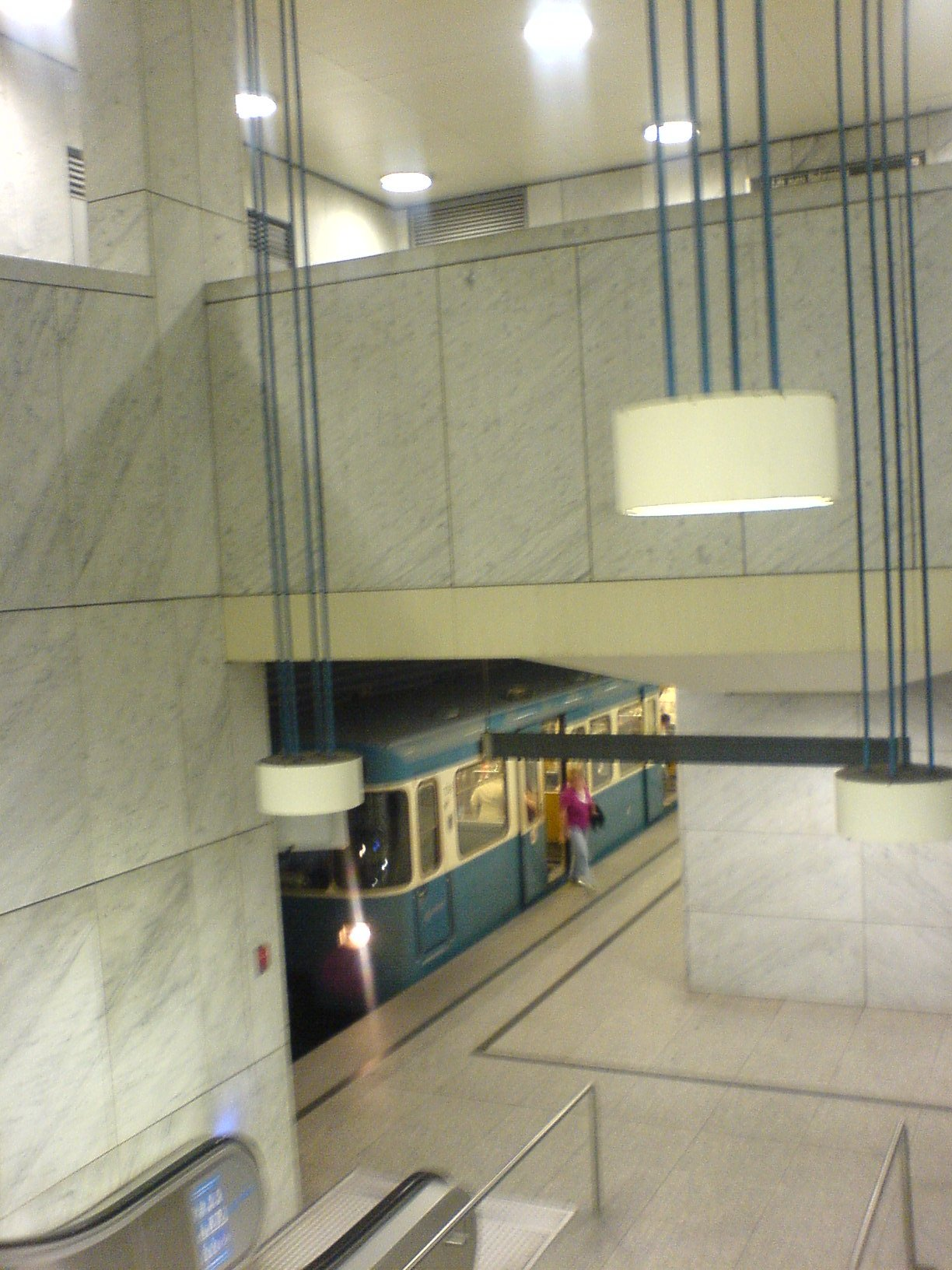
Stairs between the train platform and street levels
