= Süddeutscher Verlag =

Corporate group

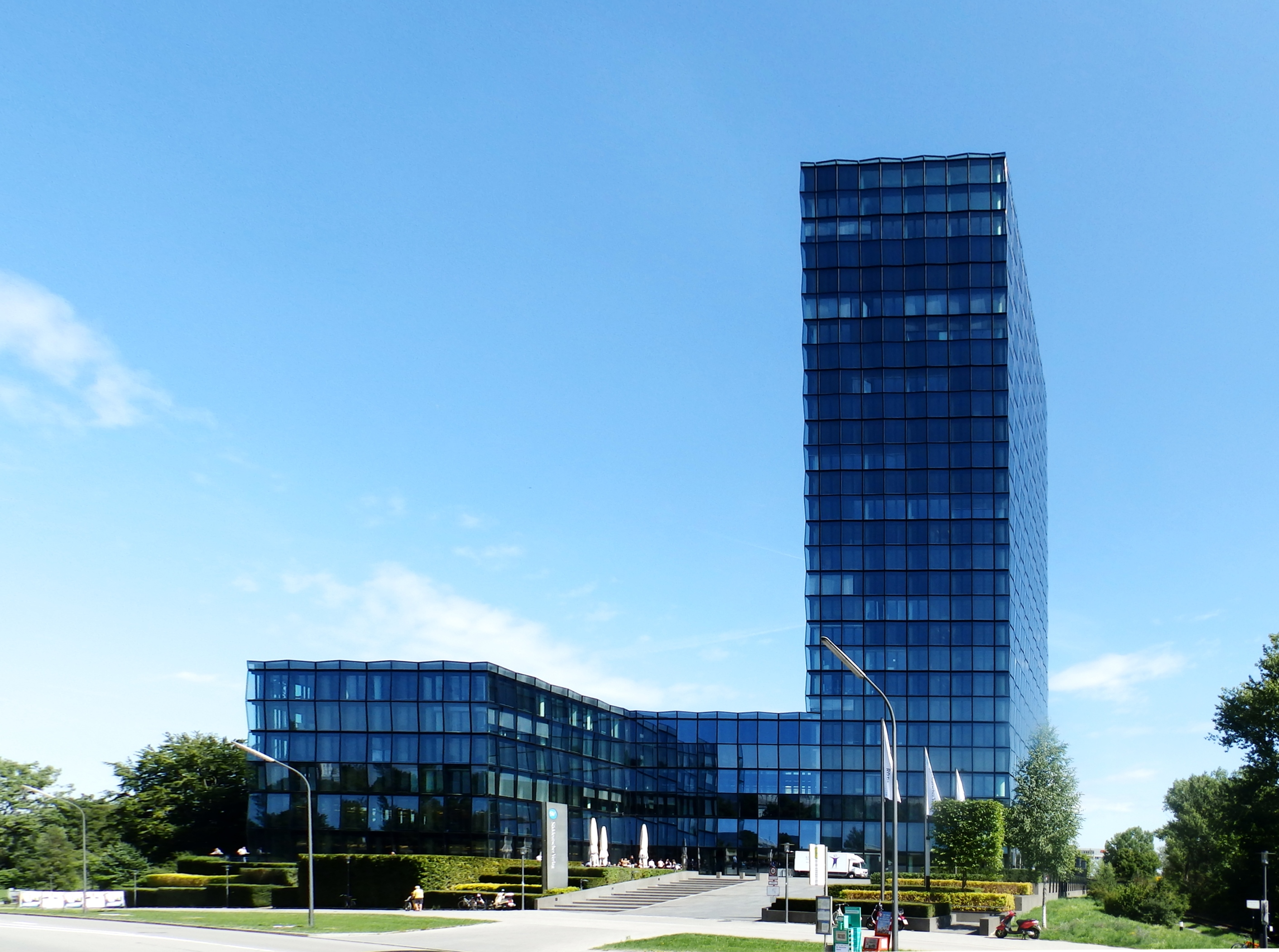
The SV-Hochhaus is the headquarters of Süddeutscher Verlag.

The Süddeutscher Verlag (SV) is a corporate group that has emerged from the Süddeutsche Zeitung.

Founded as a newspaper publisher, Süddeutscher Verlag developed into one of Germany's largest media companies, providing to Germany and abroad. The publisher has continued to focus in the areas of newspapers, journals and books. The company's headquarters is the SV-Hochhaus in Munich's district Zamdorf. The SV printing center is located in the neighboring district of Steinhausen.

== History ==
The activities of the Süddeutscher Verlag began with the publication of the first edition of the Süddeutsche Zeitung on 6 October 1945. The Süddeutsche Verlag GmbH, with headquarters in Munich, was founded in 1947 by the shareholders August Schwingenstein, Edmund Goldschagg, Franz Josef Schöningh and Werner Friedmann.

Three years later, the first book publisher was founded. Other investments, acquisitions and new formations followed. Today, more than one hundred subsidiaries are part of the Süddeutscher Verlag.

The headquarters in the Sendlinger Straße was sold by the publishing house in 2004. Since the fall of 2008, the headquarters of the publishing house is located in the new SV-Hochhaus in Munich-Zamdorf.

== Sale in 2007 ==
The Süddeutscher Verlag was largely owned by five Munich publisher families, the descendants of the founders, until 2007. These were the families of Friedmann (shares: 18.75%), Goldschagg (18.75%), Seidlein (18.75%), Schwingenstein (16.67%) and Dürrmeier (8.33%), and also the most recent addition of the Südwestdeutsche Medien Holding (SWMH) (18.75%). Chairman of the shareholder's association was Christian Goldschagg. In August 2004, Hanswilli Jenke and Klaus Josef Lutz were managing directors of the publishing house.

Four of the five associate families (Dürrmeier, Goldschagg, Schwingenstein and Seidlein) finally agreed, after years of speculation, to sell their shares totaling 62.5% in 2007. Prospective buyers that came forth were M. DuMont Schauberg based in Cologne (Frankfurter Rundschau, Kölner Stadt-Anzeiger), the Funke Mediengruppe based in Essen (Westdeutsche Allgemeine Zeitung), the Holtzbrinck Publishing Group based in Stuttgart (Der Tagesspiegel, Die Zeit) as well as for financial investors, Goldman Sachs, Apax Partners, Veronis Suhler Stevenson und 3i. The SWMH with 18.75 percent held a right of first refusal and the shareholder family of John Friedmann (Abendzeitung) was against the sale to investors. On 21 December 2007, the sale was announced, with the shares going to the SWMH. Increasing their total stakes to 81.25% effective as of 29 February 2008.

== Business areas ==
The Süddeutscher Verlag has four business areas: Süddeutsche Zeitung, regional and weekly newspapers, specialists information, and services / technology / investments.

=== Süddeutsche Zeitung, regional and weekly newspapers, and other investments ===
The largest and most important production of the Süddeutscher Verlag is the daily newspaper Süddeutsche Zeitung, which is associated with various magazines and supplements, websites and TV programs, the department "New Products" (books, CDs, DVDs), as well as newspaper advertisements and subscription management. In the area of electronic media, the Süddeutscher Verlag is active with its online services, its equity stakes in several radio stations and in the production of TV Magazine "Süddeutsche TV".

The SV is also shareholder of many regional and weekly newspapers and advertising papers in Germany and abroad:

- Newspaper group Hof / Coburg / Suhl (Frankenpost Verlag GmbH in Hof, 70% stake in the printing and publishing house Neue Presse GmbH in Coburg, Suhler Publishing Society mbH & Co. KG) with the newspapers Frankenpost, Freies Wort, Neue Presse, Südthüringer Zeitung
- Münchner Zeitungs-Verlag (12.5%; newspaper: Münchner Merkur, tz)
- ZVO Zeitungsverlag Oberbayern (12.5%)
- MWB Medien (formerly "Münchener Wochenblatt Verlags- und Werbegesellschaft") (100%), regional advertising papers
- Contract with the Free State of Bavaria on the publishing of the Bayerische Staatszeitung, and the Bayerische Staatsanzeiger in a joint venture with the Münchner Zeitungs-Verlag.

The broadcasting investments are summarized in the "SV Teleradio Produktions- und Beteiligungsgesellschaft für elektronische Medien". Among other things, SV Teleradio is shareholder of Radio Gong 96.3, TOP FM, Antenne Bayern, Studio Gong, and Sat.1 Bavaria.

=== Specialists information ===
Activities in the field of specialist information are summarized in the subsidiary company "Süddeutscher Verlag Hüthig Fachinformation GmbH (SVHFI)". There 150 specialist magazines and several thousand book titles are produced. The focus lies in the areas of communication and media, business and management, commerce, law and taxes, as well as medicine.

These include the following publishers:

- Hüthig Fachverlage with the imprints C. F. Müller Verlag, Hüthig Verlag, Hüthig & Pflaum Verlag, Wichmann Verlag
- Medical Publishing Group Medical Tribune
- Verlag Werben & Verkaufen
- Verlagsgruppe Hüthig Jehle Rehm

=== Services and technology ===
The services of SV include, besides corporate activities, archive and content services ("DIZ Dokumentations- und Informationszentrum") and Corporate Publishing (Süddeutscher Verlag Publishing, Süddeutsche Zeitung onpact). The SV also owns "Süddeutsche Zeitung Publishing", an advertising agency, targeted at teenagers, and the "Süddeutscher Verlag onpact", a public relations agency. SV also owns the publisher "moderne industrie", which through its subsidiaries offers seminars and conferences. The SZ logistics (sales, pay slips) belongs to the services division. Since February 2009, the logistics subsidiary of the SV, the Zeitungsverlag Oberbayern, the TNT Post Holding and MediaLog operate a regional postal service under the name Süd-Post.

In the fields of printing technology, typographic services are offered, for example offset printing. This way, in the SV printing center, magazines from other publishing groups (such as Bild, Bild am Sonntag and Die Welt of Axel Springer SE) as well as individual customer orders are printed in addition to the Süddeutsche Zeitung. In the printing center Suhl (subsidiary of "Suhler Verlagsgesellschaft") the publications Freies Wort, Neue Presse, Südthüringer Zeitung and Wochenspiegel among others are printed.
