= Sendlinger =

Sendlinger is an adjective related to Sendling, a borough of Munich, Germany.

It may also refer to:

- Claus Sendlinger (born 1963), German executive
- Sendlinger Straße, shopping street in the city centre of Munich, Germany
- Sendlinger Tor, area of Munich, Germany
  - Sendlinger Tor (Munich U-Bahn), its underground station
- Sendlinger murder Christmas, 1705 massacre in Munich, Germany
