= Klaus Josef Lutz =

German lawyer

- Born: March 20, 1958 (age 68); Munich, Germany
- Education: LMU Munich
- Occupation: Chief Executive Officer
- Years active: 1987–present
- Employers: Digital Equipment Corporation; Süddeutscher Verlag; BayWa
- Office: CEO of BayWa AG (2008–present)

Klaus Josef Lutz (born March 20, 1958) is a German lawyer and business manager. In 2008, he took over as chief executive officer and chairman of the board of BayWa and had since shaped the listed group with activities in the agricultural, building materials, and energy sectors. Previously, as managing director, he restructured, among others, Süddeutscher Verlag, which publishes the Süddeutsche Zeitung. Lutz is considered an expert on cooperatives.

== Life ==
Lutz was born and grew up in Munich, where he lives with his wife. After graduating from high school, he studied law at LMU Munich. In 1987, he was admitted to the bar. In 2013, Lutz was appointed honorary professor of cooperative business administration by the Technical University of Munich.

== Career ==
=== Digital Equipment Corporation ===
Lutz started his career as a lawyer at a Munich law firm. In 1989, he moved to the technology industry to join Digital Kienzle, then Germany's second-largest software company. The subsidiary of the U.S. Digital Equipment Corporation was in trouble. As managing director and labor director, Lutz oversaw the company's restructuring, which included job cuts. To mitigate the impact on the remaining employees, Lutz developed an employee company as an alternative to the traditional Auffanggesellschaft.

Between 1996 and 2002, Lutz took on leading positions in various industries, such as managing director of the Burda printing plants and board member of i-center, a wholesaler for electrical appliances that had previously belonged to Siemens. As a member of the executive board of the mechanical engineering company Unaxis, he was also involved in a profound change in the company's traditional business.

=== Süddeutscher Verlag ===
Lutz gained greater notoriety through his appointment to the management of Süddeutscher Verlag (2002). For a time, he also managed the operations of Süddeutsche Zeitung (2003). The entire group of companies had fallen into a crisis that threatened its existence due to declining advertising revenues. Lutz put an end to the nationwide expansion course and developed a modernization program. In doing so, he primarily pushed the development of new products, such as the "SZ Bibliothek" and the "SZ Editions." The circulation of the daily newspaper itself stabilized.

Lutz was the lead negotiator in the sale of a majority stake in Süddeutscher Verlag, including Süddeutsche Zeitung, to Südwestdeutsche Medien Holding (SWMH). After completed the transaction in 2007, the two parties parted ways.

=== BayWa ===
In 2008, Lutz succeeded Wolfgang Deml as chairman of BayWa's board of management. He took over an economically sound company that had never made a loss since its founding and had announced record profits the year he took office. However, the group's historically grown structure proved unsustainable, making it difficult to invest in new business areas. In addition, BayWa repeatedly struggled with fluctuating commodity prices as part of its business model.

Lutz pushed for both diversification and internationalization of BayWa, but preserved the group's historical roots. An example of changes during his tenure is creating a renewable energy business unit, which bundled all solar and wind energy companies to respond to the shrinking heating oil market. The acquisition of New Zealand fruit trader Turners & Growers gave BayWa a better position in the Asian market. Dutch agricultural trader Cefetra was purchased to give it a strong presence in European markets as well.

Lutz sold BayWa DIY and garden centers and also divested the group's car dealership. He also restructured the group's real estate portfolio. This freed up funds for the development of digital technologies for agriculture, known as smart farming. BayWa considers itself a pioneer in this field, in part due to acquisitions such as PC-Agrar (now known as FarmFacts).

During Lutz's tenure at BayWa, revenues increased from around €8.8 billion (2008) to €19.8 billion in 2021. Renewable energy now accounts for the largest share of the group's profits. Most recently, Lutz's contract was extended in 2020. In 2022, BayWa announced his move to the supervisory board in 2023, planning to become chairman.

== Memberships ==
In 2013, Lutz was elected chairman of the supervisory board of Euro Pool System International (Rijswijk/Netherlands), a leading logistics company for reusable packaging. Since 2015, he has also been Chairman of the Supervisory Board of the banknote and smart card manufacturer Giesecke+Devrient (Munich/Germany). In 2017, the German Raiffeisen Association, the umbrella organization of cooperatively organized companies in the German agricultural and food industry, elected vice president.

Lutz sits on the advisory and supervisory boards of other business enterprises in Germany and abroad. In addition, as president of the Chamber of Industry and Commerce for Munich and Upper Bavaria, as well as president of the Bavarian Chamber of Industry and Commerce, he is committed to the interests of the regional economy. This was recognized in 2019 with the award of the Bavarian State Medal.
