= Hofstatt (shopping mall) =

Shopping mall in Munich, Germany

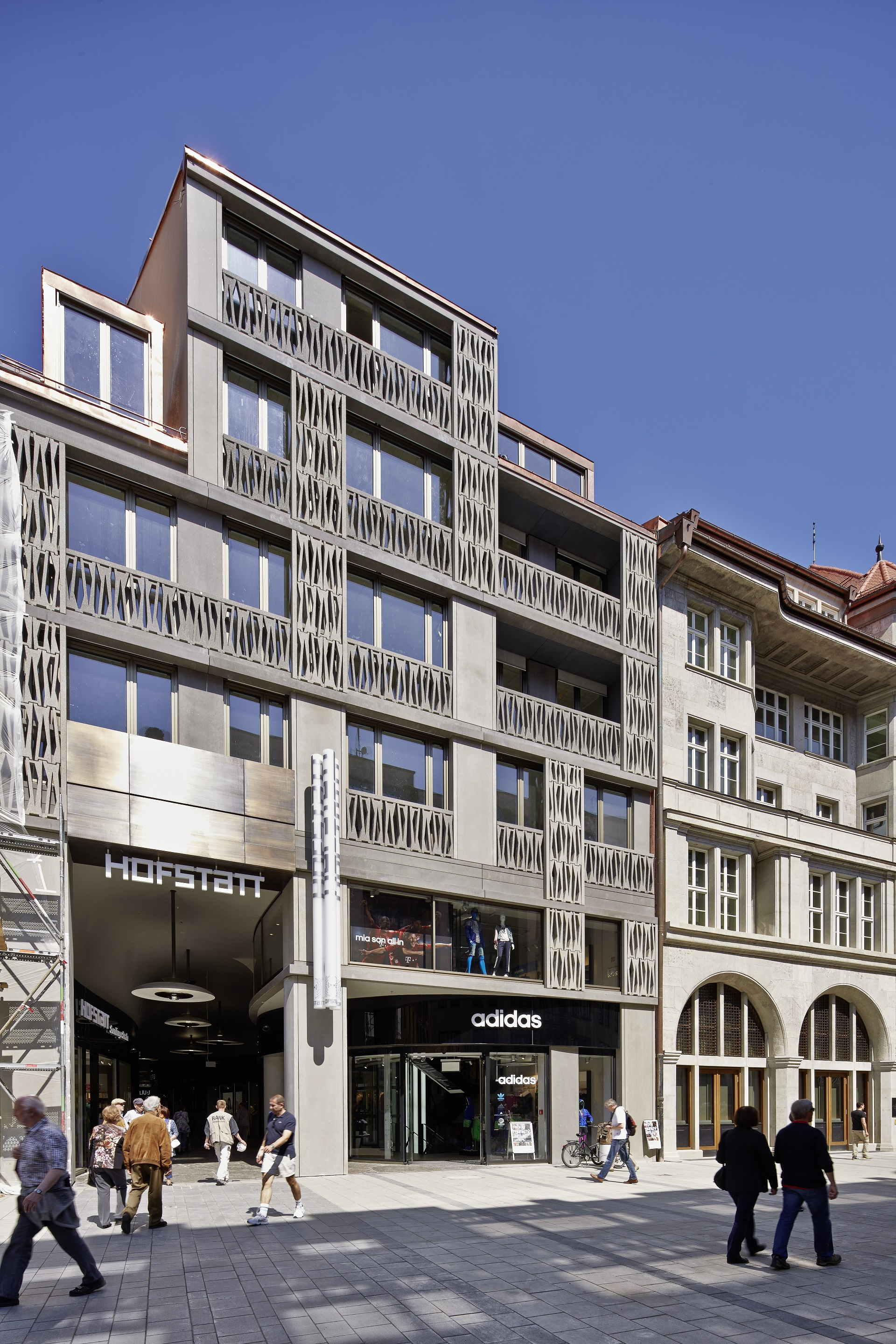
- Coordinates: 48.1363°N 11.5714°E
- Address: Sendlinger Straße 10, 80331 Munich, Germany
- Opened: 2013
- Owner: LBBW Immobilien GmbH
- Architect: Meili, Peter & Partner Architekten
- Floor area: 15.500 m^{2}
- Parking: 750
- Public transit: Marienplatz
- Website: www.hofstatt.info//

The Hofstatt is a shopping mall that opened in 2013 in Munich's old town. The core of the building is the former site of the Süddeutscher Verlag, whose historical edifices are part of the design by architect Max Littmann on the Sendlinger Straße and the brick printing press building was also incorporated into the project.

Under the name of Hofstatt, which originates from a main road, almost the entire road block was developed between Sendlinger Straße, Färbergraben, Hotterstraße and Hackenstraße. Apart from the commercial buildings, it also includes residential buildings on Hotterstrasse and Hackenstraße and is grouped around several inner courtyards.

== Shopping mall ==
The Hofstatt opened in April 2013 on an area between Sendlinger Straße, Hackenstraße and Färbergraben. It covers 15,500 m² of fashion and furnishing stores as well as gastronomic establishments and 18,000 m² of office space as well as 69 apartments. Similar to other shopping malls (for example, Fünf Höfe, Stachus-Passage or Kaufingertor-Passage), it is close to the central Munich intercity junctions between Marienplatz and Sendlinger Tor.

== Architecture ==
The three-armed shopping mall connects Marcel Meili's new building, completed in 2013, with a partly protected historical portion. This way, the 1905/06 facade designed by Max Littmann, was used for the 1945-2008 editorial building of the Süddeutsche Zeitung and then the completely emptied core of the building was integrated. A central point is the "Lichthof", which owes its name to a glass dome, which had covered the printing building of the Süddeutsche Zeitung. On the curved passages, shop windows made of curved glass panes, are to be seen.

The previously inaccessible inner courtyards of the site have been open to the public since the reopening.

There are offices in the upper floors of the commercial buildings. With the shopping mall, apartments were also built on the property, but in separate buildings on Hofstatt street and the corner of Färbergraben.

== Economical ==
The building was erected by the real estate agency of Landesbank Baden-Württemberg and the American real estate company Hines Interests Limited Partnership and was acquired by Quantum Immobilien AG after its opening at the end of 2013, and who has marketed it since then and acts as the owner's representative. The purchase price was around 400 million euros.

The originally planned completion date at the end of 2010 could not be sustained, among other things, due to the elimination of contaminated sites (residues of the former printers of the Süddeutsche newspaper) and financing questions.

Permanent renter is Abercrombie & Fitch, which operates one of eight of its German branches at Sendlinger Straße 8.

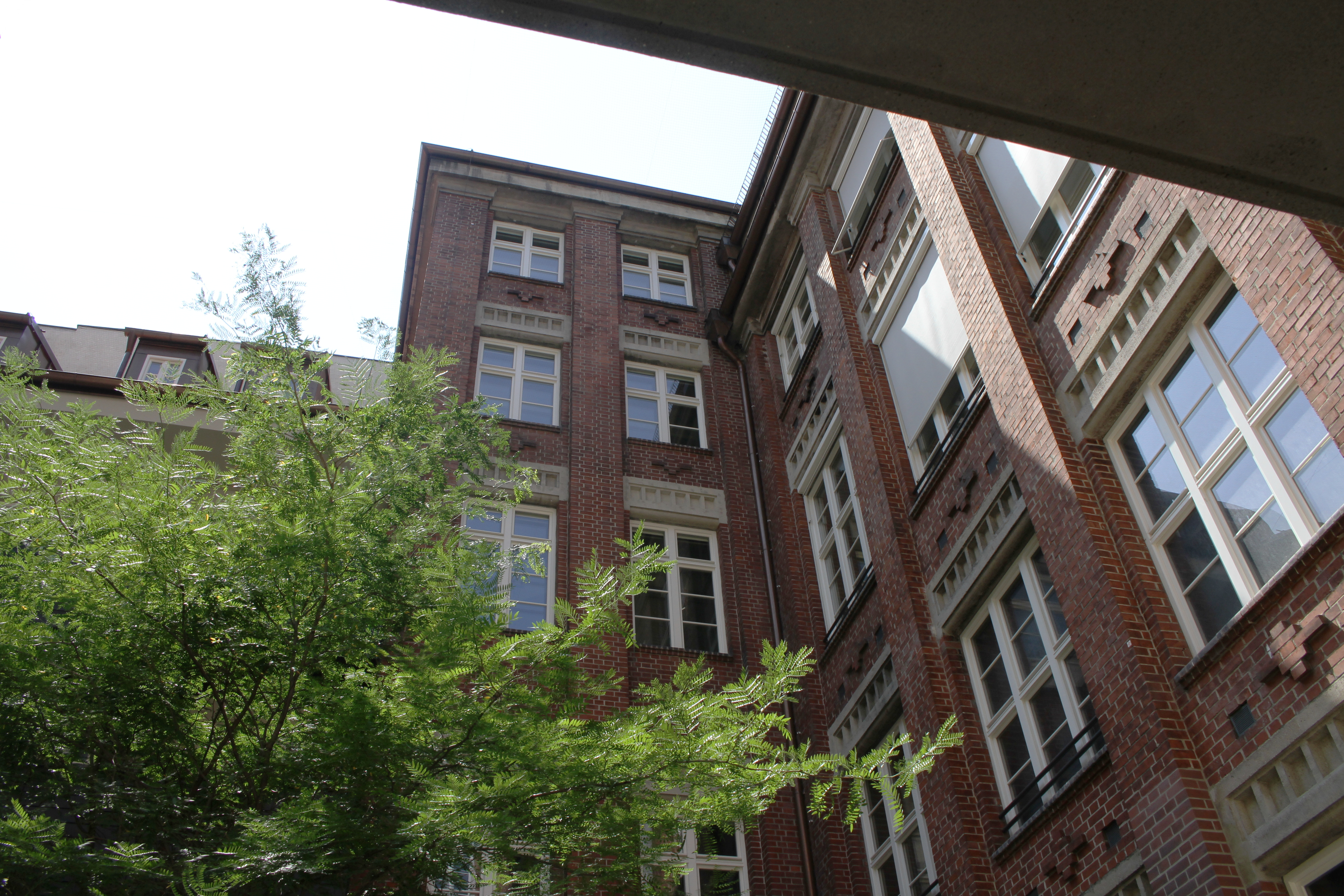
Inner courtyard of the historical printing building

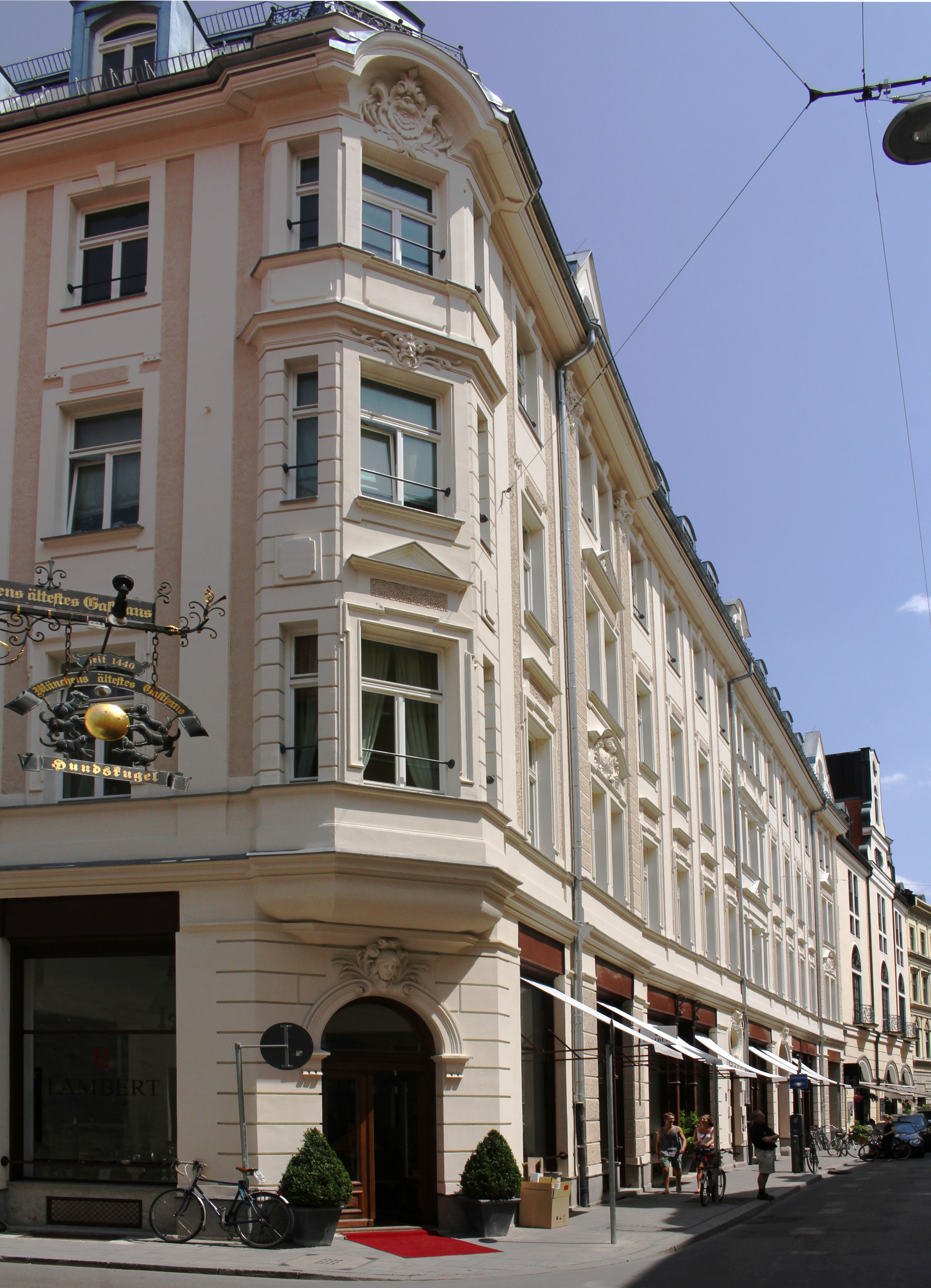
Restored old building on the Hackenstraße with retail and apartments

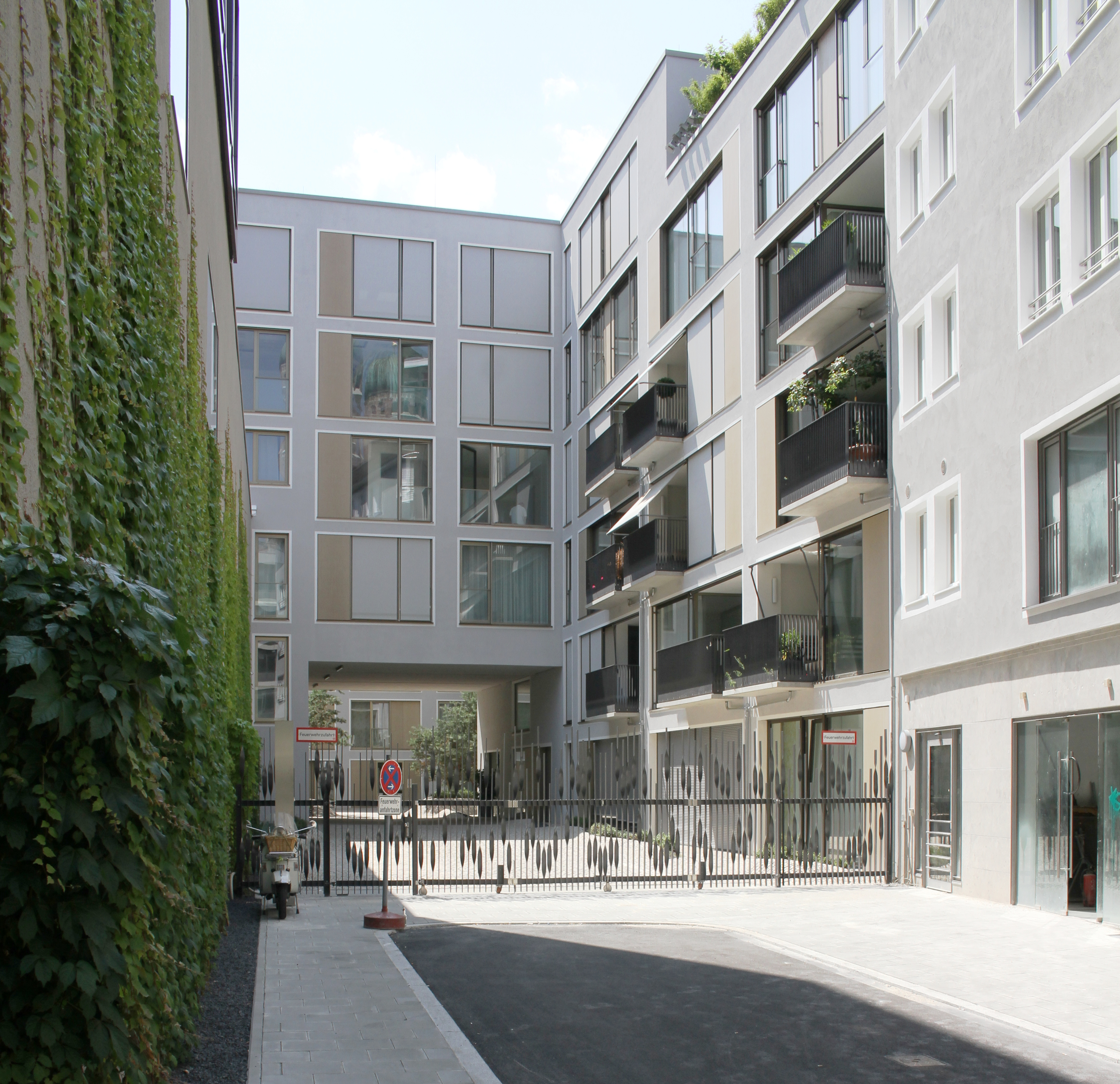
StiMain street Hofstatt with residential buildings

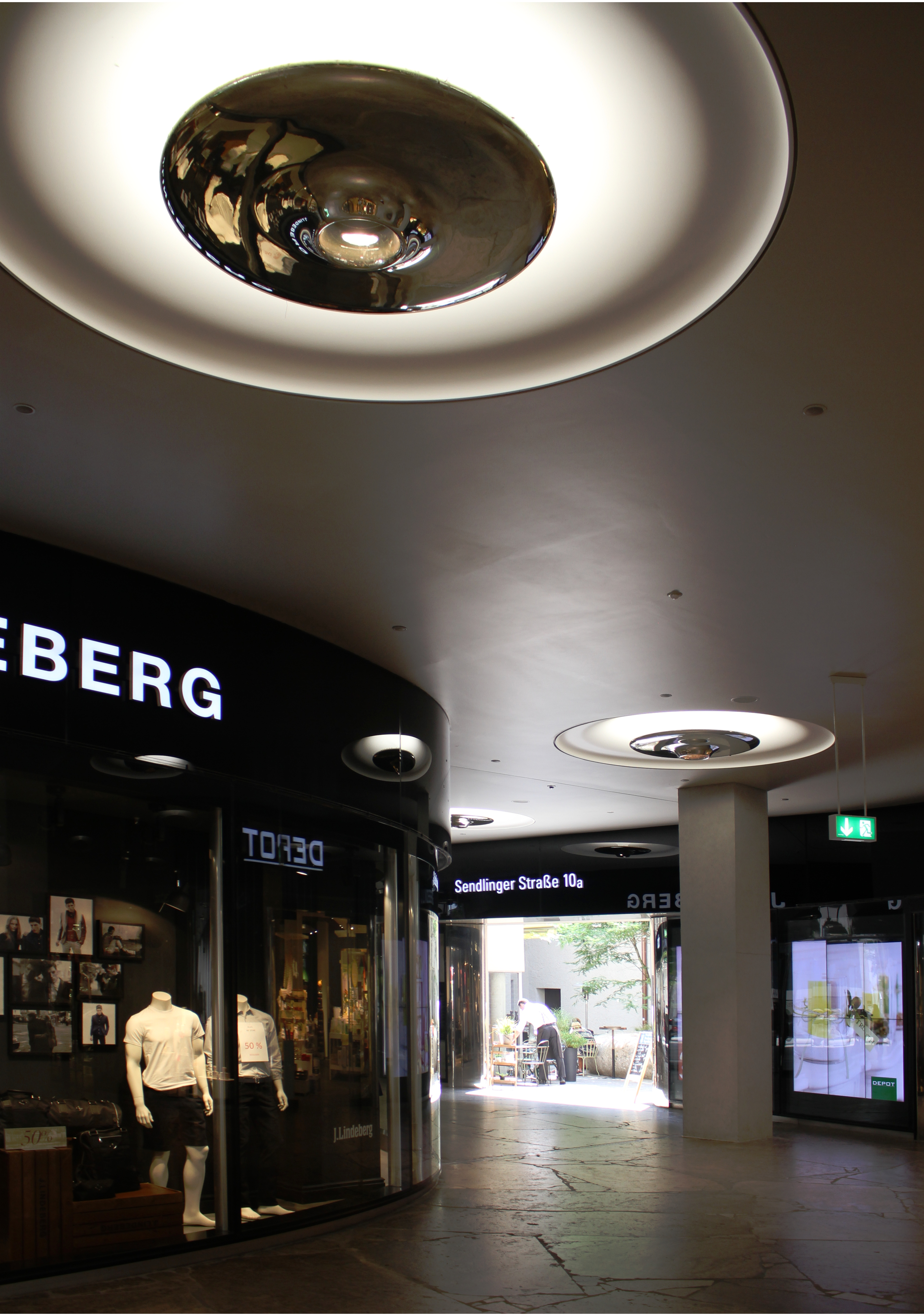
Design of the shopping mall
