= Abendzeitung =

Newspaper from Munich, Germany

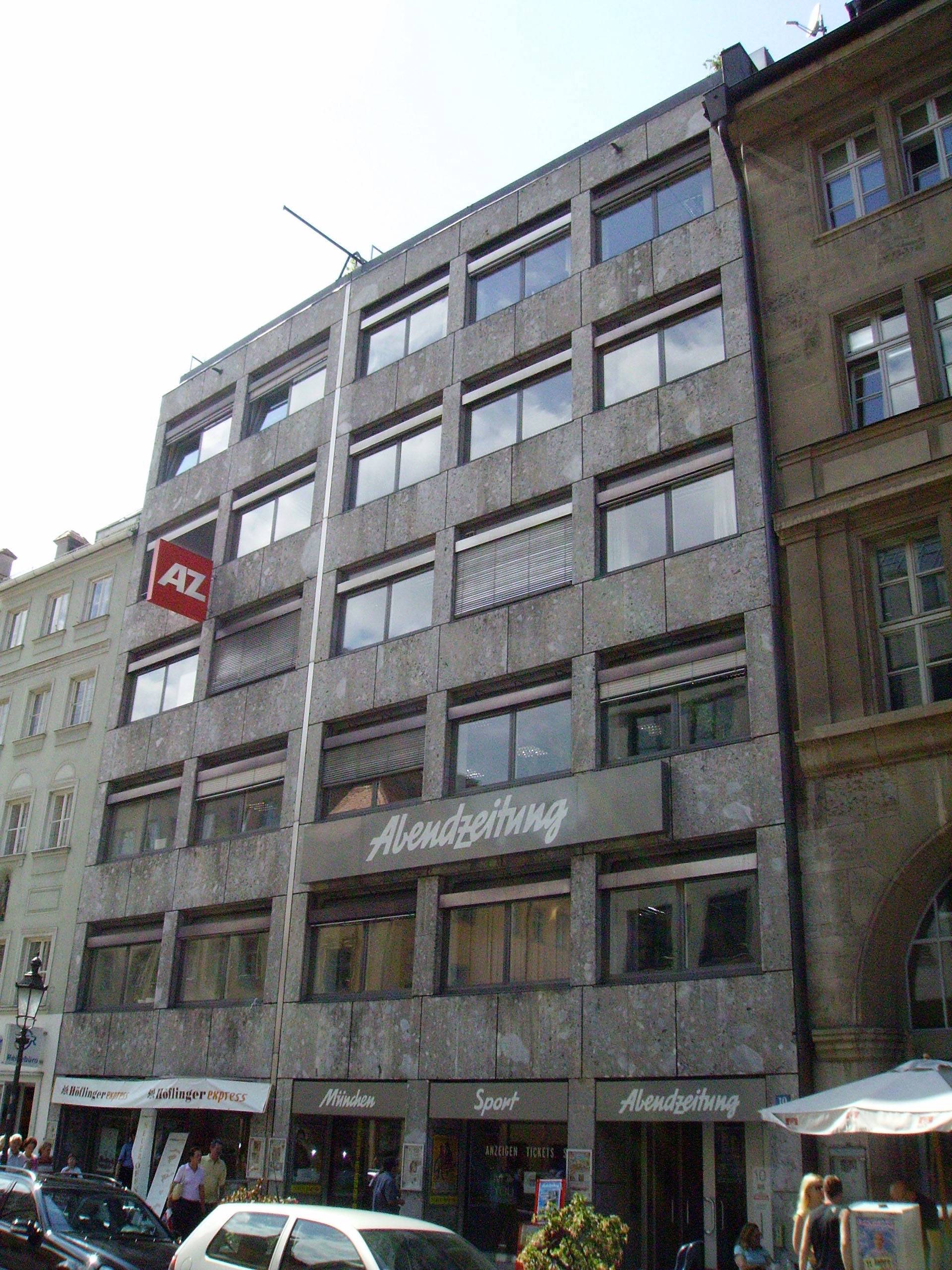
- Abendzeitung headquarters in downtown Munich
- Type: Daily newspaper
- Format: Tabloid
- Owner(s): Verlag DIE ABENDZEITUNG GmbH & Co. KG
- Publisher: Anneliese Friedmann; Dr. Johannes Friedmann
- Editor: Arno Makowsky
- Founded: 1948; 78 years ago
- Headquarters: Munich, Germany
- Circulation: 107,634 (2013)
- ISSN: 0177-5367
- Website: abendzeitung.de

The Abendzeitung lit. 'Evening Paper'), sometimes abbreviated to AZ, is a morning tabloid newspaper from Munich, Germany. A localized edition is published in Nuremberg. The paper is published six days a week; the masthead of the Saturday edition is held in light blue. Rivals on the Munich tabloid market are tz and a localized edition of the national mass circulation phenomenon Bild-Zeitung.

== History ==
AZ was founded by Werner Friedmann on 16 June 1948 as a street selling newspaper. Friedmann's goal was to provide Munich with a tabloid newspaper also appealing to the intellectual circles of society. Munich and its environs are the main distribution area of the paper. Friedmann was also one of the founders of the Munich broadsheet Süddeutsche Zeitung, in which the Friedmann family still holds a financial stake as minority shareholder with 18.75% of the capital of the publishing company.

In the 1980s, the paper had a daily circulation of 300,000 copies. The newspaper lost approximately 16.5 percent of sales, compared to the fourth quarter of 1998. Based on 2006 figures, the AZ has an estimated weekday readership of 320 000. based on 225 000 printed copies. Its 2013 circulation was 107,634 copies.

Until 2008, the Abendzeitung missed out on developments in the newspaper industry. The takeover of the editorial board by Arno Makowsky, an experienced local journalist from Munich, should help change that. The newspaper was converted back to a local newspaper focusing on sports and culture. At the same time, significant improvements to the newspaper's website were made. In September 2008, AZ moved from its former headquarters in the Sendlinger Straße to the Hopfenpost. The shopping arcade Hofstatt was built on the property. Because of "economic difficulties" the management decided, in March 2010, to considerably reduce the number of employees in the editorial and publishing sections. Concluding in a reduction of 22 from the 80 positions in the newsroom. The Süddeutsche Zeitung reported that a total of 40 out of the 90 employees were affected by the job cuts. In November 2010, the AZ reinforced its Munich city desk. Michael Schilling was appointed city editor, to which his deputies were Timo Lokoschat and Thomas Müller. Tina Angerer took over the newly created position of local section's chief reporter.

=== Bankruptcy filing ===
On 5 March 2014, the Abendzeitung filed for bankruptcy. Since 2004/2005 the publisher had losses of around €70 million, of which €10 million alone were in 2013. The income from the sales of the former headquarters in Sendlinger Straße and of Nürnberger Abendzeitung were completely depleted because of this. The owner's family was not able to continue to bear the losses. As a first measure, the liquidator raised the sale price on weekdays from 60 cents to 1 euro. The magazine Der Spiegel cited, as the reason for the decline of AZ, that it had a very expensive and long-term contract with the printing plant and a reduction of the newspaper's content, of which only a good sports section remained.

== Nuremberg edition ==
The Nuremberg edition of the evening paper came about in the 1960s through the acquisition of the 8-Uhr-Blatt (8-o'clock-journal) from Nuremberg. The 8-o'clock-journal was first published in 1918.

In 2010 the Abendzeitung sold the Nuremberg edition and the advertising journal Der Frankenreport to "media-regional", a company of the Nuremberg publisher and radio operator Gunther Oschmann. A close cooperation between the two editions in Munich and Nuremberg was preserved, as well as the title. The out of region section of the newspaper continued to be based in Munich. The Federal Cartel Office approved the acquisition on 1 March 2010.

The circulation sales of the Abendzeitung Nürnberg went below 14,000 copies per day in the third quarter of 2012. On 27 September 2012, Managing Director Roland Finn announced the end of the Nuremberg edition to be 29 September 2012, to which 35 employees lost their jobs.

In addition, the Abendzeitung tried to establish local publications for Stuttgart and Augsburg, to which the attempts were unsuccessful.

== Editors-in-chief ==
- Arno Makowsky (2008–present)
- Michael Radtke (2005–2007)
- Kurt Röttgen (2000–2005)
- Uwe Zimmer (1987–2000)
- Udo Flade (1961–1986)
- Rudolf Heizler (1949–1961)
- Walter Tschuppik (1948–1949)

== Gallery ==
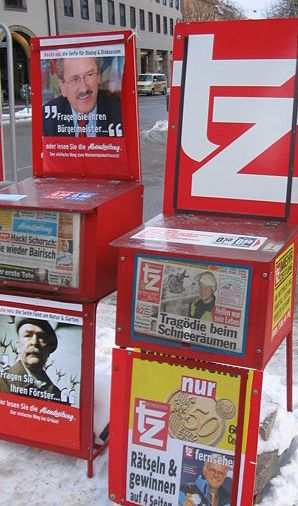
Typical tabloid vending stands in a wintery Munich. The weekend Abendzeitung competes here with local rival tz.
