= Sonnenstraße =

Street in Munich, Germany

The Sonnenstraße is a street in the city center of Munich. It forms the border between the city districts Altstadt and Ludwigsvorstadt.

== Description ==
The Sonnenstraße is part of the Munich Altstadtring and runs north-south between the Sendlinger Tor and Stachus. The wide road has up to eight lanes and a four-rail track in the middle from the Munich tram.

There are numerous clubs, such as the Technoclub Harry Klein, along the road of just under one kilometer. It therefore connects the Maximiliansplatz with the Glockenbachviertel as a "party mile". Due to the curved course of the road, it is also referred to as "celebration banana".

== History ==
Along the Sonnenstraße ran the early-new aged fortification construction of Munich. The street was given its present name in 1812, since its course is oriented towards the highest position of the sun at noon.

Parallel to the Sonnenstraße (near the Herzog-Wilhelm-Strasse), the western Stadtgrabenbach runs underground, it flows near the Sendlinger gate out of the Glockenbach and follows the north and later north-east of the former city fortification. There are plans to uncover the river partially.

The Matthäuskirche, built in 1833, was the first evangelical church in Munich and it stood on Sonnenstraße, near the merge of the Herzogspitalstraße, until the end of 1938.

In 1846, on the Sonnenstraße, August Hauner founded the Dr. From Haunersche Kinderspital, which is now located on Lindwurmstraße. In 1856, the Frauengebäranstalt was completed on the Sonnenstraße, the first building in the Maximilian style by the architect Georg Friedrich Christian Bürklein, where from 1922, the postal check office, now the Isarpost Eventlocation, has been located there. On the Sonnenstrasse was the Hotel Wagner, where the Kabarett Wien-München and from 1934 to 1935 the Valentin Panoptikum were located.

== Images ==
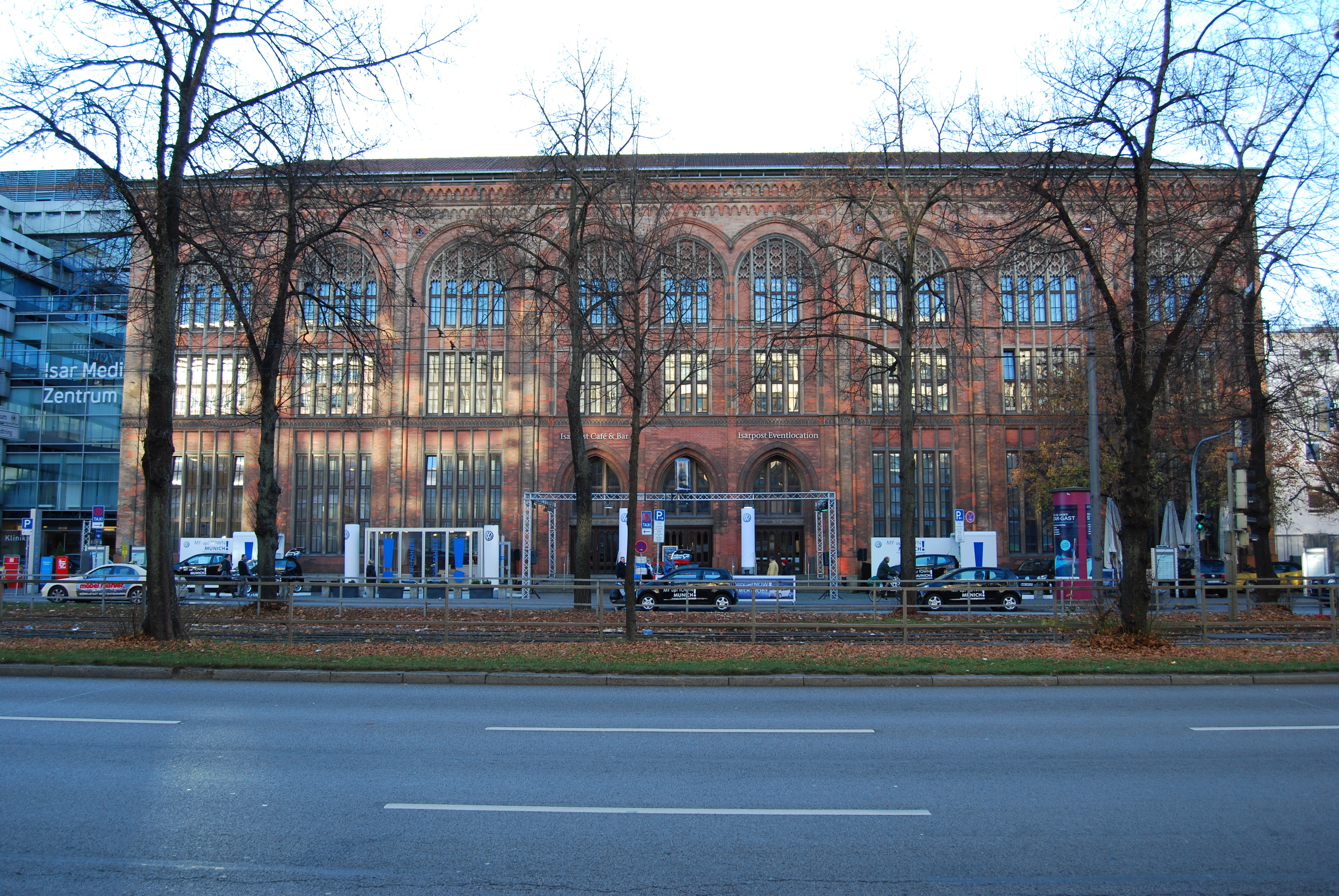
Isarpost, Sonnenstraße 26

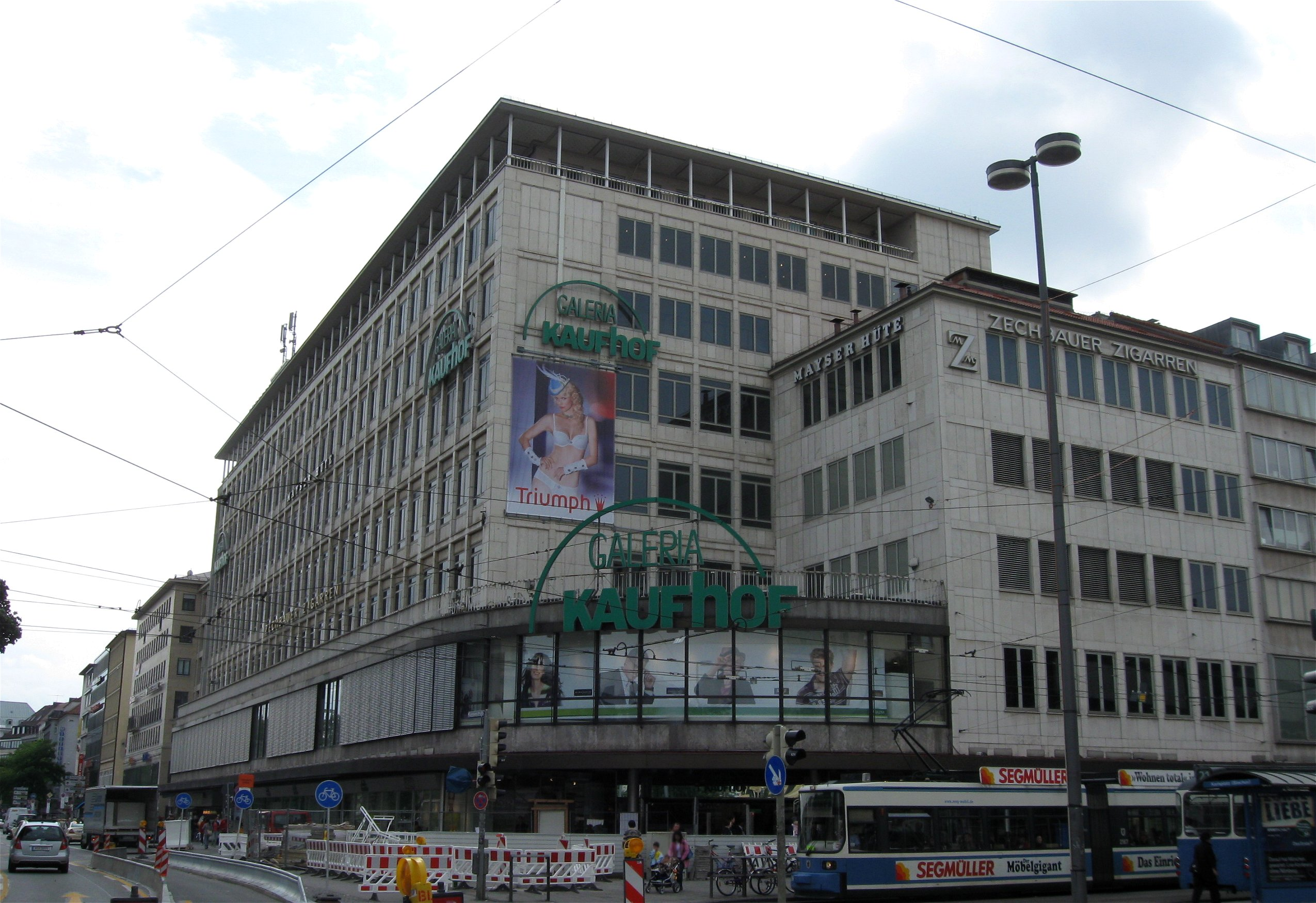
Department store Kaufhof

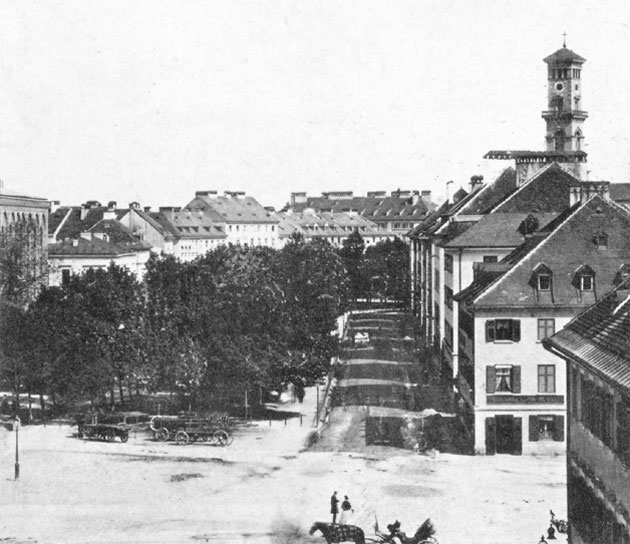
Sonnenstraße, approx. 1870

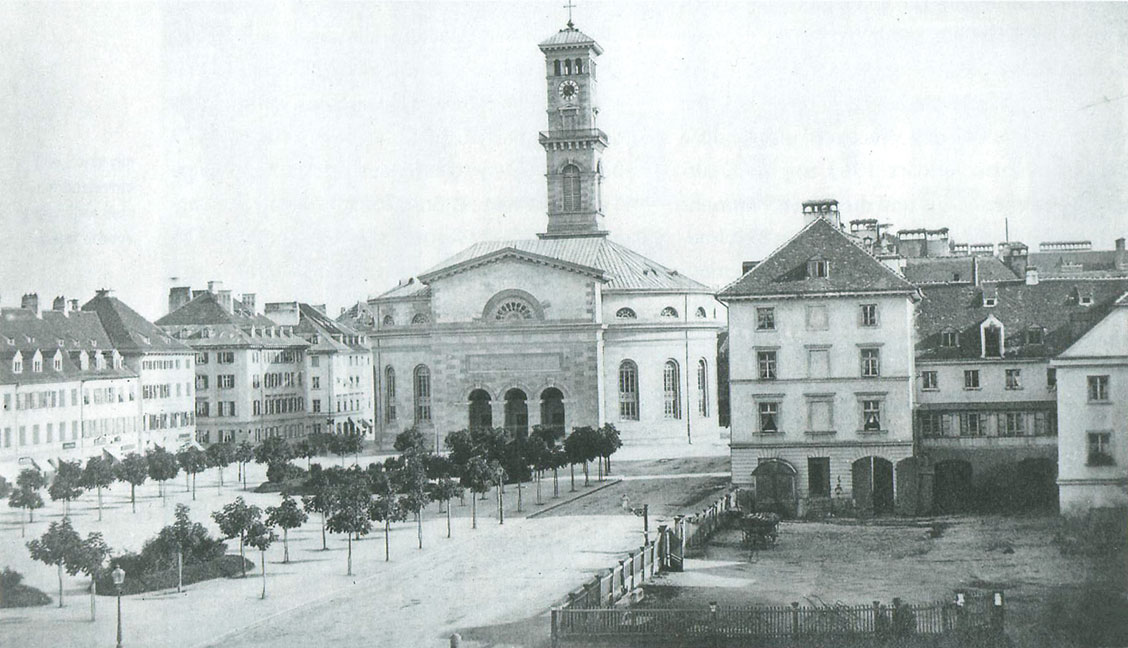
Matthäuskirche, approx. 1865
