= Wolfgang Deml =

German entrepreneur

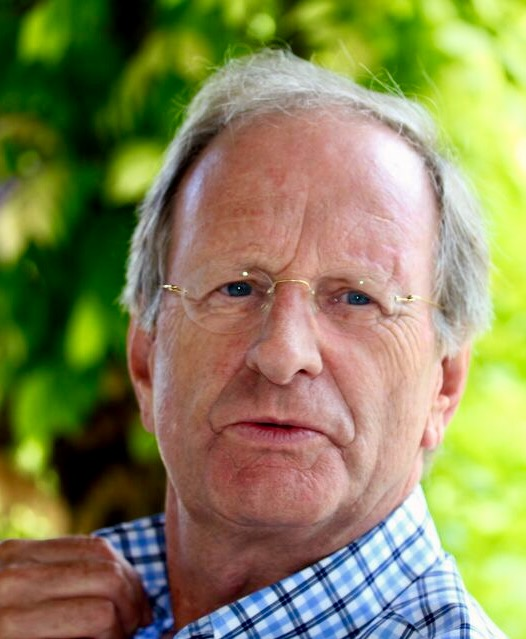
Wolfgang Deml (2014)

Wolfgang Deml (born July 31, 1945, in Tegernsee, Bavaria) is a German entrepreneur. Since 2011, he's served on the Board of Hauck & Aufhauser KGaA and is a member of the Supervisory Board of the AGCO AG in Atlanta.

== Career ==
Deml studied industrial engineering at LMU Munich. He began his career in management consulting at Rosenkrantz and Roland Berger, later, he was Chief Executive Officer at Union Investment. . From 1988 to 2008 he was a member of the board of BayWa AG, since 1991 as CEO Deml was a Vice President of the German - Raiffeisen AG and Chairman of the Austrian-Raiffeisen Landesbanken. He was a contributor member of Lundenburger Invest Beteiligungs AG, Süddeutsche Zuckerrübenverwertungs Cooperative eG to December 2003, MAN Truck & Bus Nutzfahrzeuge AG and Landwirtschaftliche Rentenbank, the Bayerische Landesbank and Raiffeisen Ware Austria Aktiengesellschaft.

Since 1999, he supported the supervisory boards of corporations AGCO, VK mills, Leipnik- Lundenburger Invest Beteiligungs AG, "Our warehouse" Warenhandelsgesellschaft mbH and Mannheimer Versicherung AG. Since 2011, he chairs the Supervisory Board of the Hauck & Aufhauser KGaA and is a member of the Supervisory Board of the AGCO AG in Atlanta. Since 2009, he has been a member of the Advisory Board of Halder Beteiligungsberatung GmbH, which he chairs since 2014.
