= Tz (newspaper) =

German tabloid

tz
- Type: Daily tabloid
- Publisher: Zeitungsverlag tz München GmbH & Co. KG
- Editor: Rudolf Bögel
- Founded: 1968
- Headquarters: Munich
- Circulation: 120,533 daily (Q3 2015)
- Website: www.tz.de

The tz (for Tageszeitung, German for daily newspaper) is a Munich-based tabloid, which belongs to the media group Münchner Merkur/tz from publisher Dirk Ippen. The tabloid's main circulation areas include Munich and the surrounding area of Upper Bavaria. Editors are the Münchner Merkur owners, Dirk Ippen and Alfons Döser, who is also CEO of Oberbayerisches Volksblatt. Chief editor is Rudolf Bögel, who before was head of local competitor Abendzeitung. The daily sales in the third quarter of 2015 were 120,533 copies, which is a decline of 19.7 percent since 1998.

== History ==
The tz was founded in 1968 as a spin-off of the Münchner Merkur. From 1968 to 1970, the well-known television broadcast journalist Erich Helmensdorfer was the first editor of the paper. In 1982, the Westphalian publisher Dirk Ippen bought the Münchner Zeitungsverlag, to which the tz belonged also.

Since June 2006, the tz published an online version of the newspaper as tz Live. In February 2008, tz Live was transformed into the multimedia news portal tz-online.de, which since 4 December 2013 can be found under the domain tz.de. With this re-launch the news portal was designed and technically adapted to the needs of mobile internet.

The online editorial team ensures that the portal is filled with actual daily news. The thematic focus is on local news from Munich and Upper Bavaria, as well as sports and boulevard topics.
