= SV-Hochhaus =

Headquarters of the Süddeutscher Verlag

Coordinates: 48°08′13″N 11°38′07″E

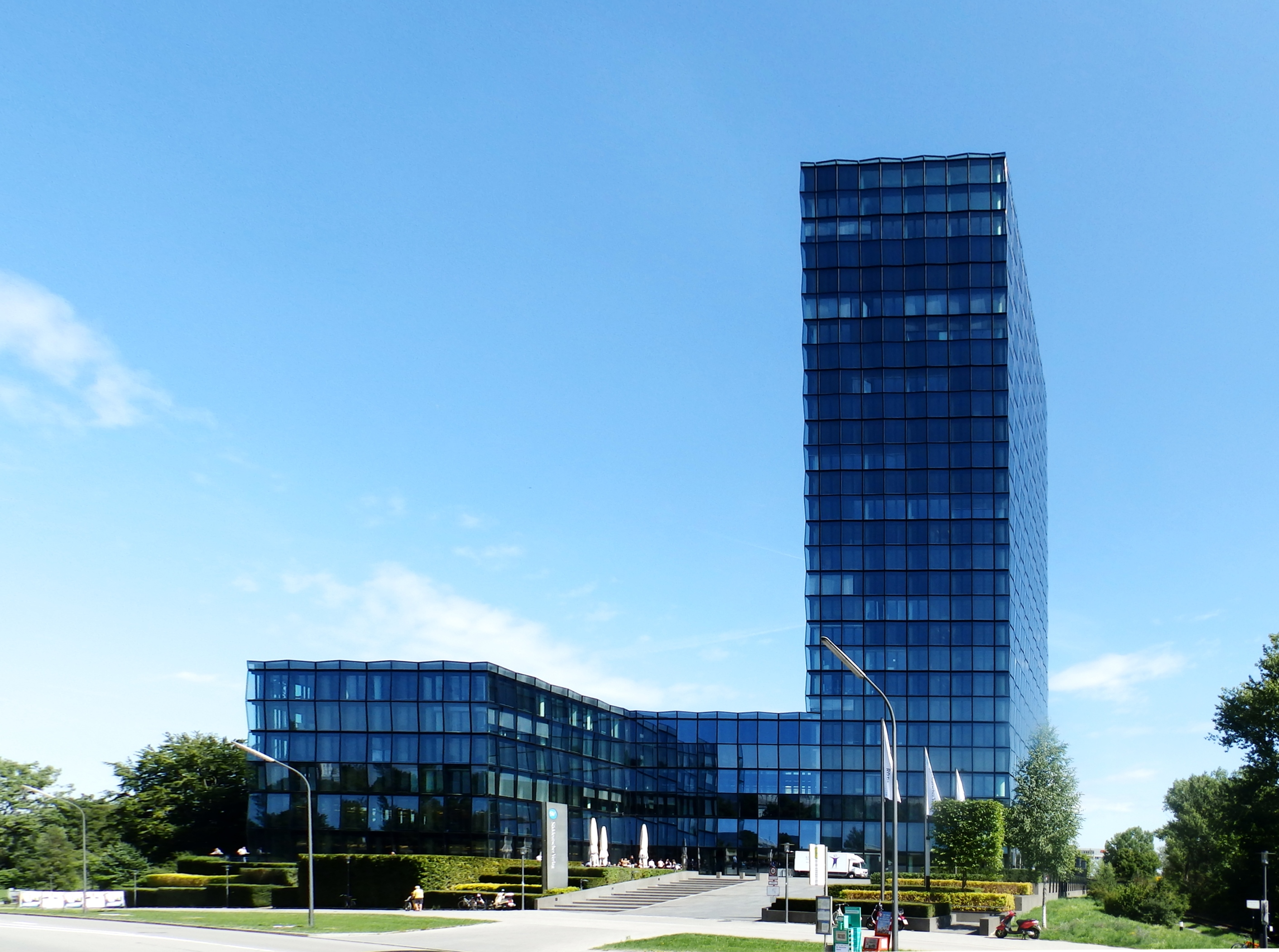
SV-Hochhaus in September 2013

The Hochhaus Süddeutscher Verlag (short: SV-Hochhaus, Hochhaus = high-rise building) in Munich houses the headquarters of said publishing house, Süddeutsche Zeitung and the German School of Journalism. It is located in the commercial area of the Zamdorf neighborhood, part of the Berg am Laim district, between the A 94 motorway and the Berg am Laim S-Bahn station.

Designed by Oliver Kühn of Berlins’ GKK+Architekten, it was initially planned to be 145 meters high, but had to be redesigned after a Munich citizens' initiative called for a height limit of 100 meters outside the Mittlerer Ring circular road. The skyscraper now reaches an architectural height of 103.00 m and a height (roof) of 99.95 m. The building has 28 floors above ground. In total, it has a floor area of 78,400 m^{2}, with 51,200 m^{2} above ground and 27,200 m^{2} below ground. Since the gross floor area was not to change as a result of the re-planning, the high-rise became much lower, but a lot wider, than in the original design. There is also an underground car park with 553 parking spaces in the basement.

Since 1985, the publishing house's print shop has been located across the street from Hultschiner Straße.

The high-rise was built by Hochtief AG as the general contractor. The groundbreaking ceremony took place on January 24, 2006, the laying of the foundation stone was on May 19, 2006, and the topping-out ceremony took place on July 20, 2007.

In December 2007, the Süddeutscher Verlag sold the building to the Munich pre-REIT company Prime Office and leased it back for 15 years. In November 2008, the publishing house moved from the iconic Schwarzes Haus (München) in Munich's old town to the high-rise building. The publishing house has 1850 jobs there.

In 2010, the building was the first office building in Germany to receive the LEED gold certificate for its climate and energy concept.
