= Sendlinger Straße =

Shopping street in Munich, Germany

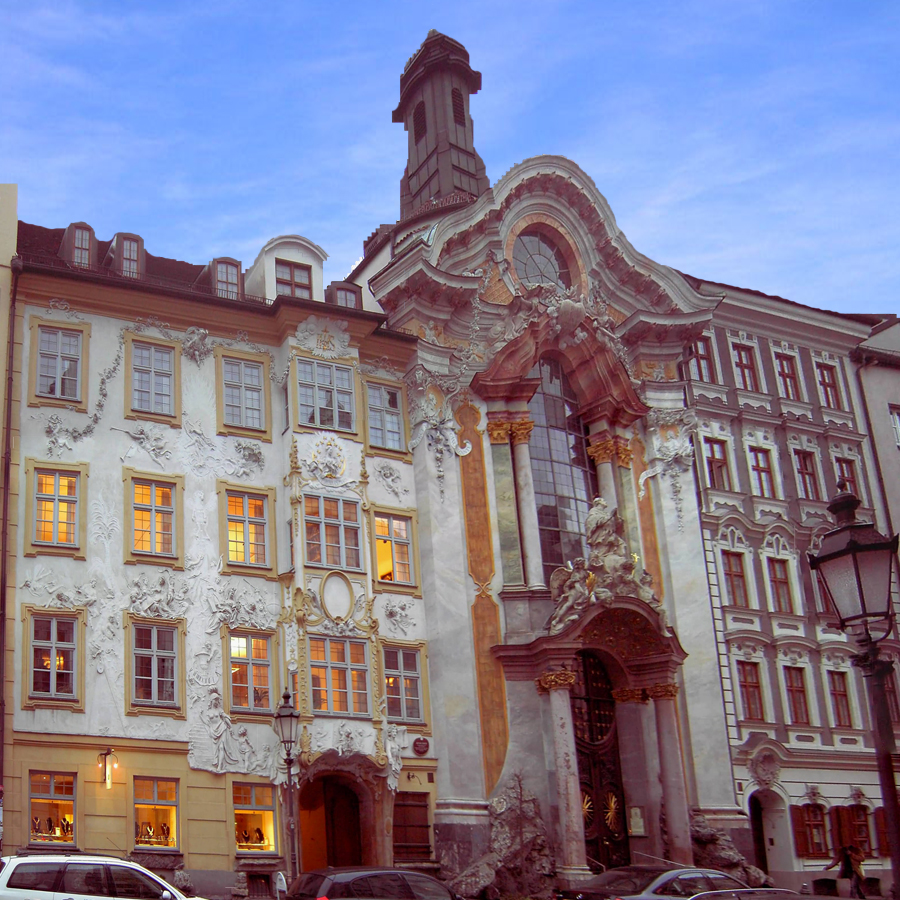
Asamhaus (left) and Asamkirche (center right) in Sendlinger Straße

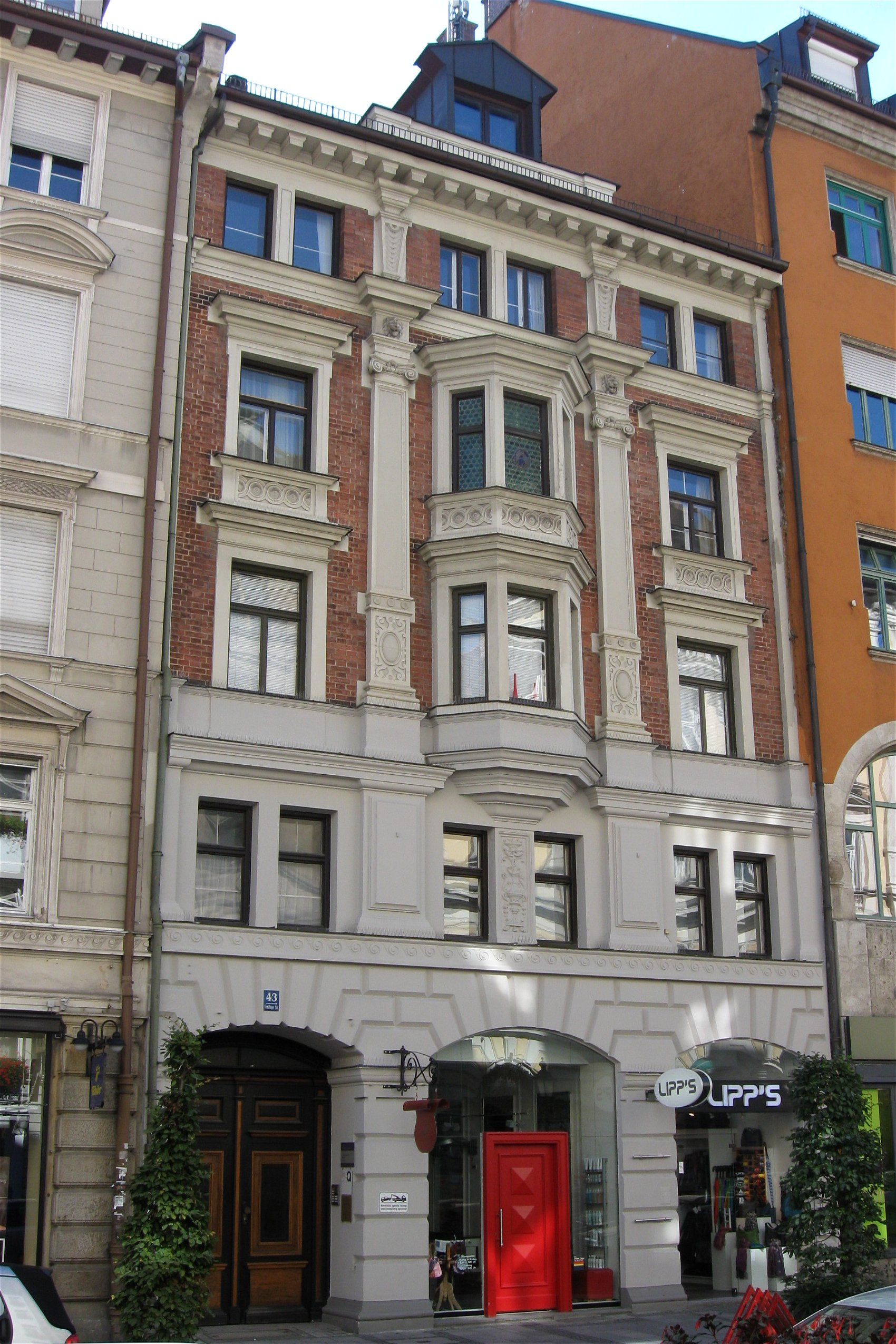
Sendlinger Str. 43: New renaissance construction

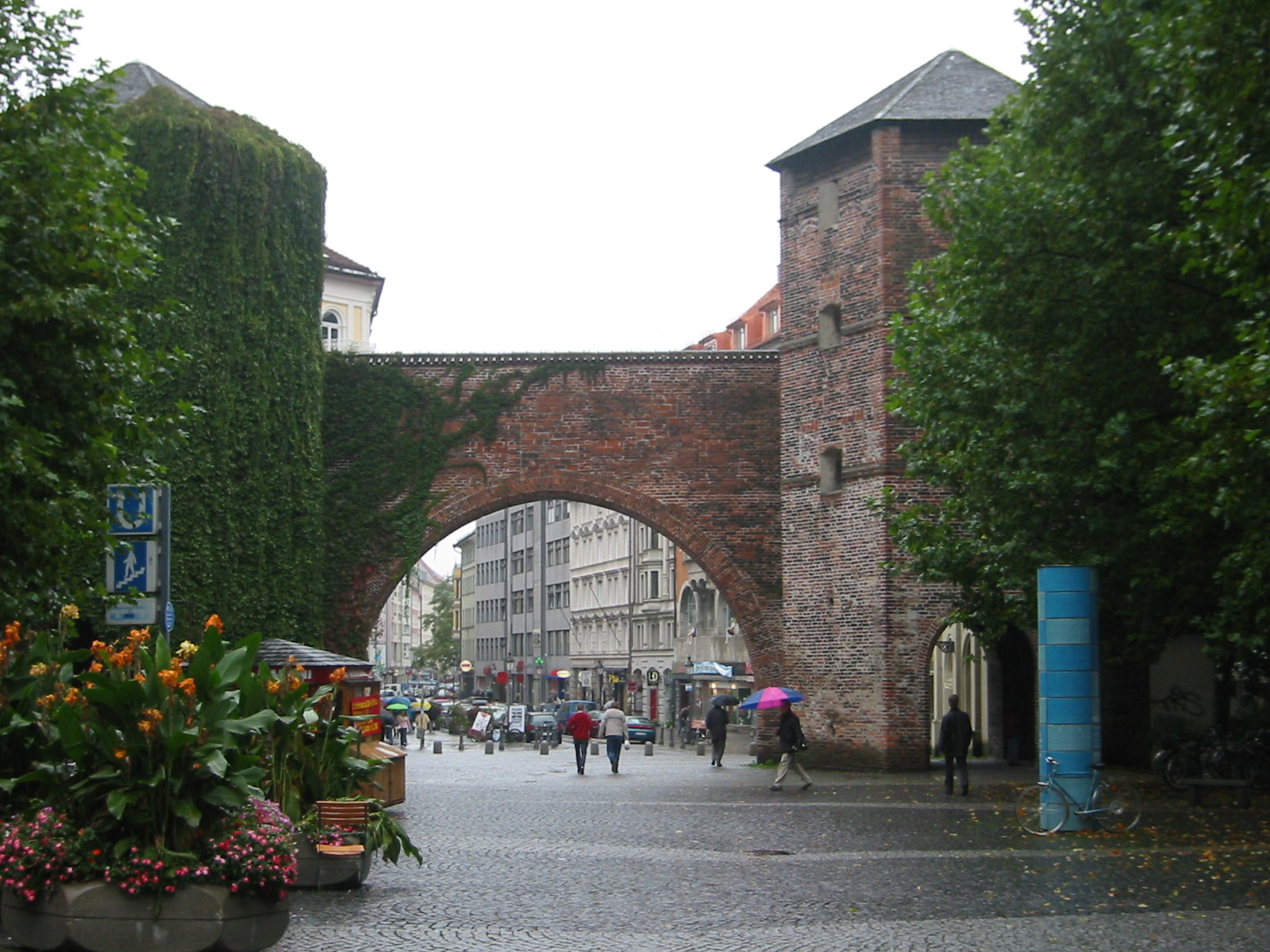
Sendlinger Tor with Sendlinger Straße in the background

Sendlinger Straße is an important shopping street in Munich's city center. It extends into the Munich old town in the south-east-northeast direction from the Sendlinger Tor in the west to the point where Fürstenfelder Straße and the Rindermarkt meet in the east. In July 2016, the conversion from a one-way street into a pedestrian zone was attempted.

== History ==
The Sendlinger Straße was named after its original destination: Sendling. This was the first place in the 14th century, after the Sendlinger Gate, outside of Munich's city walls, to which the Sendlinger Strasse led.

The Asamhaus and, in particular, the Asamkirche, which was established between 1733 and 1746 by two chief representatives of the South German Baroque: the Asam brothers (Egid Quirin Asam and Cosmas Damian Asam) are of artistic and cultural-historical importance. The Asamkirche is one of the most important monuments on Sendlinger Straße, in which a total of 24 monuments are located.

In the post-war period, the Munich red light milieu, which had already migrated a while back, was found here. A tram connected the Sendlinger Tor with the Marienplatz, until this route was replaced by the underground lines U3 / U6. Over the years the sidewalks have increasingly widened and the roadway for the cars has been correspondingly narrowed. In 2009, the city council of Munich decided that a section of about 120 meters between Hackenstraße and Färbergraben would become a pedestrian zone. The construction work began in 2012.

Today there are numerous shopping opportunities in Sendlinger Straße, next to restaurants and cafes. In order to expand the range of shops, courtyards have been developed – such as the "Asam Hof" next to the Asamkirche or the "Hofstatt" on the former site of the Süddeutscher Verlag.

The city's plans for the complete conversion of the street into a pedestrian zone are controversial and led to the establishment of a citizens' initiative by local residents against this traffic attempt. Environment and transport organizations such as Green City and the Verkehrsclub Deutschland welcome the plans and even suggest extending the pedestrian zones beyond the old town - roughly to the eastern half of Sonnenstraße. Since 1 July 2016, the Sendlinger Straße, is a pedestrian zone for one-year on a trial basis.
