= Münchner Merkur =

German (Bavarian) daily newspaper

- Type: Daily newspaper
- Owner(s): Dirk Ippen, Alfons Döser
- Publisher: Münchener Zeitungs-Verlag GmbH & Co. KG
- Editor: Bettina Bäumlisberger
- Founded: 13 November 1946
- Political alignment: Conservative
- Headquarters: Munich
- Website: www.merkur.de

The Münchner Merkur (German pronunciation: [ˈmʏnçnɐ ˈmɛʁkuːɐ̯], literally "Munich Mercurius", i.e. the Roman god of messengers) is a German Bavarian daily subscription newspaper, which is published from Monday to Saturday. It is located in Munich and belongs to the Müncher Merkur/tz media group. The paid circulation of the Münchner Merkur is 271,335 copies.

== History ==
The Merkur was the second newspaper after the Süddeutsche Zeitung which was allowed to be published in Munich. 1968 the subsidiary tz was brought onto the market as a tabloid.

The first edition of what was initially named Münchner Mittag ("Munich Noon"), was released on 13 November 1946 through a licence of the American military government. One of the founding members and publishers was Felix Buttersack.

In 1982, the Westphalian publisher Dirk Ippen purchased the Munich newspaper group including the newspapers Münchner Merkur and tz.

Every year since 1996, readers of the Münchner Merkur have been voting for the winner of the Merkur-Theaterpreis (Merkur-theatre-prize).

=== Chief editors ===
- 1948–1963: Felix Buttersack
- 1963–1973: Kurt Wessel
- 1973–1975: Franz Wördemann
- 1975–1983: Paul Pucher
- 1983–1995: Werner Giers
- 1995–2000: Peter Fischer
- 2000–2000: Monika Zimmermann
- 2000–2002: Wilhelm Christbaum
- 2001–2007: Ernst Hebeker
- 2007–2013: Karl Schermann
- since 2014: Bettina Bäumlisberger

== Readership ==
Münchner Merkur has recorded 971,000 total readers, 488,000 of them male and 483,000 female.

Germany's national subscription papers read in Bavaria
No.	Newspaper	Readers
1	Münchner Merkur	937,000
2	Süddeutsche Zeitung	847,000
3	Nürnburger Nachrichten	794,000
4	Augsburger Allgemeine	723.000
5	Passauer Neue Presse	437.000
6	Main-Post	419.000
