= BayWa =

German agriculture company

BayWa AG
- Type: Public
- Traded as: FWB: BYW6
- Industry: Retail and agribusiness conglomerate
- Predecessor: Württ. Warenzentrale Landwirtschaftlicher Genossenschaften
- Founded: 1923; 103 years ago
- Headquarters: Munich, Bavaria, Germany
- Number of locations: 50 (2021)
- Area served: Worldwide
- Key people: Klaus Josef Lutz (CEO and Chairman of the Management Board); Manfred Nüssel (chairman of the Supervisory Board)
- Products: Trading of agricultural products, fertiliser and seeds, sale of agricultural equipment, fruit distribution
- Revenue: ▲€27.1 billion (2022)
- Number of employees: ▲22,508 (2022)
- Website: baywa.com/en
- Footnotes; Consolidated Financial Statements 2022

BayWa AG (until 1972: Bayerische Warenvermittlung landwirtschaftlicher Genossenschaften AG) is an internationally active group headquartered in Munich, Germany. Originally founded to support domestic agriculture, the company expanded its activities to the construction and energy sectors. BayWa is represented in more than 50 countries through its subsidiaries and holdings. The shareholder structure is still determined by the cooperative sector, which has shaped the corporate culture since its founding.

== History ==
=== Foundation and early years ===
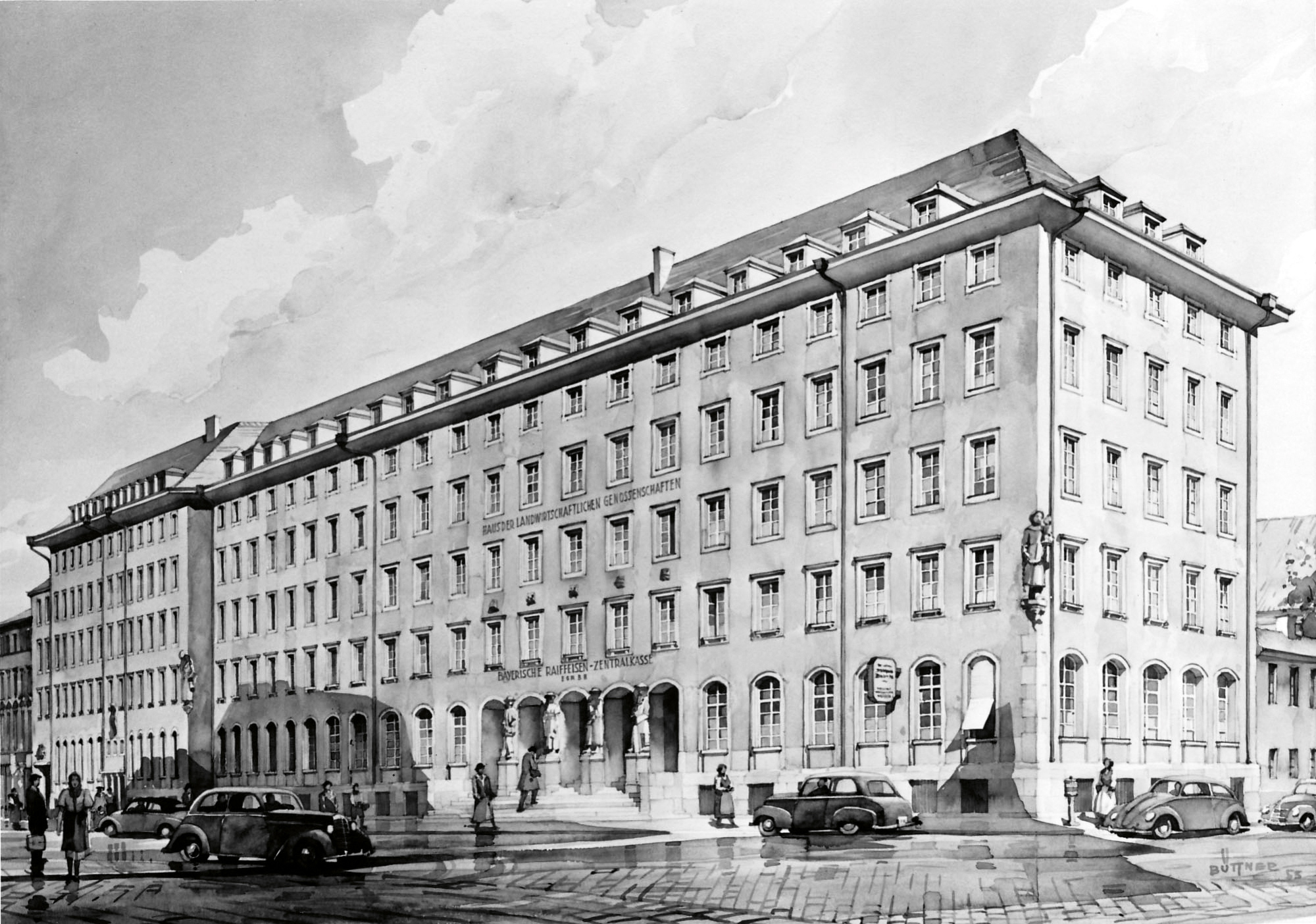
Head office on Türkenstrasse in Munich, 1953

BayWa's history goes back to the Bayerische Zentral-Darlehenskasse (BZDK), which was founded in 1893, and was active in both the banking and commodities business. One of its central tasks was to enable farmers to purchase means of production at low cost and to market their products profitably. In 1920, the BZDK had hundreds of warehouses for grain, artificial fertilizers, feedstuffs, and machinery, mainly in southern Germany. As a result of the First World War, economic conditions steadily deteriorated. The devaluation of cash and bank deposits led to hyperinflation, which prompted the BZDK to separate its banking and merchandise business. The general meeting on January 17, 1923, thus marked the founding of the Bayerische Warenvermittlung landwirtschaftlicher Genossenschaften in the legal form of a stock corporation. In the vernacular, BayWa became established as the short form of the company. From the beginning, the company focused on modern agriculture, especially through its range of machinery and services for repair. In order to become less dependent on business in Germany, grain was also exported to Austria, Switzerland, and Italy from 1927. As a result, BayWa's sales exceeded the 100 million Reichsmark mark for the first time.

The takeover of power by the National Socialists also brought drastic changes for the agricultural and food industry. From 1933, all agricultural organizations were brought into line. In 1934, the unification of the Bavarian cooperative system was ordered. Political influence on the company continued to grow. When Josef Haselberger, then chairman of the board, died in 1935, the NSDAP appointed Friedrich Eichinger as his successor. He led the company until the end of National Socialism.

After the outbreak of the Second World War, BayWa switched to a wartime economy in 1939. The company played a prominent role in "safeguarding the Reich's food supply. For example, BayWa convinced farmers of the production-enhancing effect of artificial fertilizer. In order to meet the requirements of the rulers alone, BayWa employed an additional workforce of almost 700 during this period. The company archives do not provide any information on whether forced laborers were among them, but it can be assumed that they were.

=== Reconstruction after the Second World War ===
In the course of the Second World War, 23 BayWa warehouses were destroyed. The headquarters in Munich was also affected by the Allied bombing raids. By the end of the war in 1945, 512 of around 6,000 employees had died; 487 were missing or in captivity. With the aim of denazification, all members of the Board of Management and Supervisory Board had to vacate their posts in 1945. In addition, dozens of managers were dismissed. Their successors initially took office on an interim basis. Josef Singer took over as chairman of the Board of Management of BayWa. Due to its strategic importance for supplying the population with food, BayWa received early approval from the U.S. military government to resume its business operations as well as nationwide shipments.

The 1950s were marked by structural change in agriculture. In the countryside, there was a lack of personnel for the steady expansion of agricultural operations, as the growing industry became more attractive to many workers. BayWa responded by expanding its range of machinery as well as maintenance and services in the technology sector. Tractors, combine harvesters, forage harvesters and milking machines were in particular demand. The increased consumption of meat also necessitated more animal fattening, so that the steady rise in sales of concentrated feed compensated for the drop in sales of hay and straw. Agricultural mechanization and automation continued throughout the 1960s, and 1970s.

At the same time, the company benefited from the real estate boom that began in the 1950s, and continued through the 1960s, and 1970s. The sale of building materials developed into an important mainstay. The company also laid the foundation for BayWa DIY superstores and garden centers in 1975, to establish another sales channel. The sale of heating oil and other lubricants formed the basis for BayWa's network of filling stations in the 1950s, with which the company wanted to reflect the desire for individual mobility.

=== Organizational changes and international expansion ===
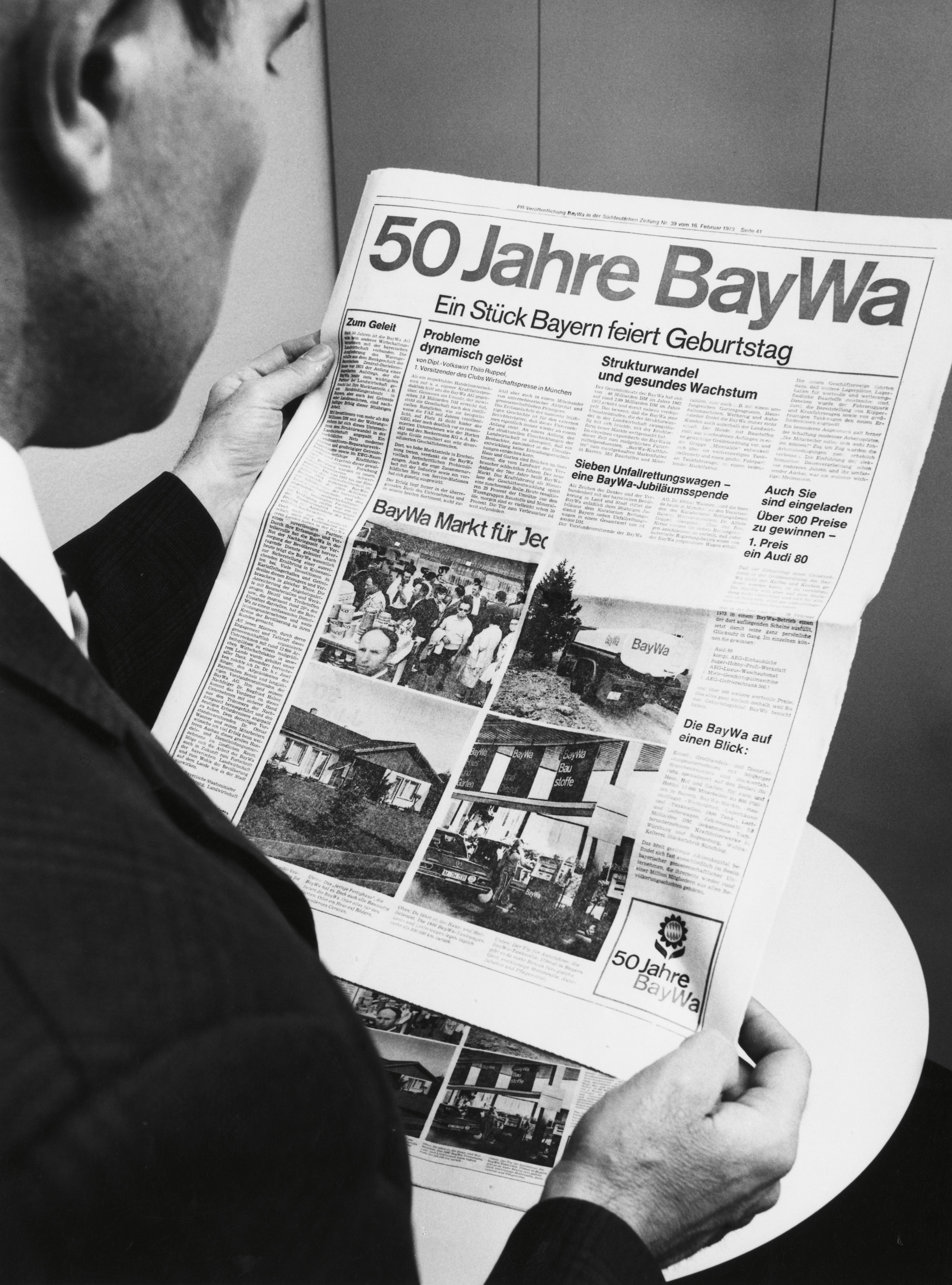
Newspaper celebrating BayWa's 50th anniversary

The expansion of business activities from the agricultural sector to the construction and energy industries led to significant growth in BayWa's sales. In 1959, this exceeded the one billion Deutsche Mark mark for the first time and by the end of the 1960s, had already exceeded the two billion mark. In 1970, BayWa was the first company in the industry to introduce electronic data processing into its operations. To improve efficiency of internal document management, IBM scanners were used on a large scale, capable of processing more than 100,000 documents a day.

In order to reflect the change in the company's external image, the Bayerische Warenvermittlung landwirtschaftlicher Genossenschaften was officially renamed BayWa on July 13, 1972. In addition, the personal union of the Board of Management with the Bayerische Raiffeisen-Zentralkasse (BRZ), which had been established in the 1960s, was abandoned. Otl Aicher, who also designed the corporate design for the 1972 Summer Olympics in Munich, created a new logo for the company. The green square is still used today.

In the 1980s, trends such as environmental protection and electronics opened up new opportunities for the company's business. Nevertheless, BayWa had to contend with structural problems in the agricultural sector as well as the construction industry. In response to the economic downturn, the company introduced a divisional organization in 1986. However, the collapse of Bayerische Raiffeisen-Zentralbank (BRZ) was decisive for this decade. BayWa's main shareholder had run into trouble due to speculation on the real estate market. Bayerische Raiffeisen-Beteiligungs-Aktiengesellschaft took its place.

After German reunification, BayWa also became involved in the new federal states and set up locations in Brandenburg, Saxony, and Thuringia. In doing so, it cooperated with the Bäuerliche Handelsgenossenschaft (BHG) and also relied on a franchise system.

In 1994/1995, BayWa also became active in Austria through acquisitions. With the help of existing subsidiaries, it was also able to expand its business to Eastern Europe (Bulgaria, Croatia, Poland, Slovakia, the Czech Republic, and Hungary). In order to grow not only internationally but also in the domestic market, Württembergische Warenzentrale was acquired in the early 2000s.

=== Recent developments ===
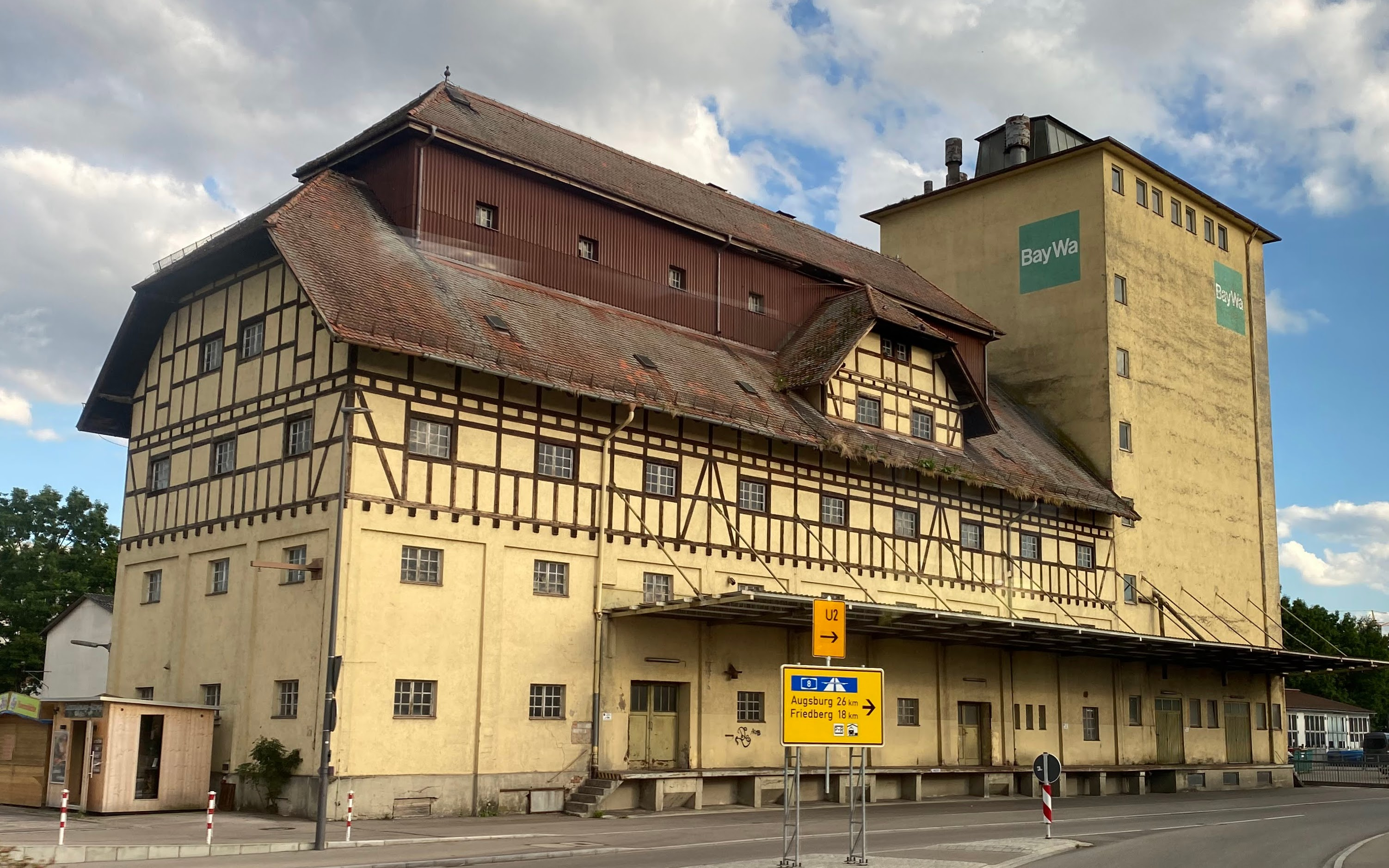
The former BayWa building in Aichach

At the end of the 2000s, BayWa's business model and organizational structure proved to be no longer fit for the future. Following his appointment as chairman of the Board of Management in 2008, Klaus Josef Lutz initiated a comprehensive restructuring program designed to drive innovation while still preserving the company's historical roots. The new strategy prioritized both the diversification of business activities and the internationalization of BayWa.

One example of this is the establishment of the renewable energies business sector, which now accounts for the largest share of Group profit. Since 2021, Energy Infrastructure Partners owns 49% of the BayWa r.e. subsidiary. By acquiring the Dutch grain trader Cefetra and the New Zealand fruit trader Turners & Growers, BayWa secured a stronger position in global competition in agricultural trade, both in Europe and in Asia. Own innovations and acquisitions of other suppliers made BayWa an important market player in digital farming.

Today, BayWa's activities cover the entirety of the agricultural supply chain, from seed production and crop protection through to food processing. Additionally, the company has a synergistic presence in the energy, and building materials sectors.

== Corporate affairs ==
=== Shareholders ===
The share capital of BayWa Aktiengesellschaft amounted to approximately €90 million as of December 31, 2019. The shares are traded on the Frankfurt Stock Exchange and the Munich Stock Exchange as well as via Xetra. They are part of the Prime Standard of Deutsche Börse, a legally regulated stock exchange segment with the highest admission requirements.

The shareholder structure of BayWa Aktiengesellschaft is determined by Raiffeisen companies from Germany and Austria. BayWa Aktiengesellschaft's Articles of Association intentionally restrict the group of shareholders in order to preserve the cooperative character of the company. BayWa's largest shareholder is Bayerische Raiffeisen-Beteiligungsgesellschaft (34.75%), based in Beilngries. It is joined by Raiffeisen Agrar Invest (25.01%) based in Vienna. Around 40% of the shares are in free float, so that the corresponding threshold for inclusion in the SDAX is reached.

=== Boards ===
The Board of Management of BayWa Aktiengesellschaft consists of several, but no more than nine, members. They are appointed by the supervisory board for a term of up to five years. Multiple appointments are possible so that the term of office is de facto not limited. The supervisory board appoints the chairman of the Board of Management. The Articles of Association stipulate that one member of the Board of Management should be mainly responsible for human resources and social affairs. Further details on the allocation of duties in the management board are governed by rules of procedure.

Currently (as of April 2021), there are four members of the Board. These are Klaus Josef Lutz (Chief Executive Officer) and Andreas Helber (Chief Financial Officer), as well as Marcus Pöllinger and Reinhard Wolf.

The Supervisory Board of BayWa Aktiengesellschaft consists of sixteen members. Re-election is possible so that the term of office of members of the supervisory board is not limited. The supervisory board appoints a chairman and at least one deputy chairman from among its members. Currently (as of July 2020), four women and twelve men are members of the supervisory board. Its Chairman is Manfred Nüssel, Honorary President of the German Raiffeisen Association. His deputies are Werner Waschbichler and Klaus Buchleitner.

BayWa Aktiengesellschaft's Articles of Association provide for a Cooperative Advisory Council. This accompanies and supports the work of the Board of Management and the supervisory board. Its members are selected by the Board of Management and, with the approval of the supervisory board, appointed by the Board of Management for a period of up to four years. This may also be repeated. Currently (as of July 2020), the board has 28 members, including main representatives of various cooperatives, associations, and from politics in Germany and Austria. Karl-Heinz Kipke chairs the committee and is represented by Manfred Nüssel.

=== Financials ===
in Mio€.	2016	2017	2018	2019	2020	2021
Revenues	15,409	16,055	16,625	17,059	17,155	19,839
EBIT	144	171	172	188	215	266
Dividends per share	€0.85	€0.90	€0.90	€0.95	€1.00	€1.05

== Businesses ==
=== Energy ===
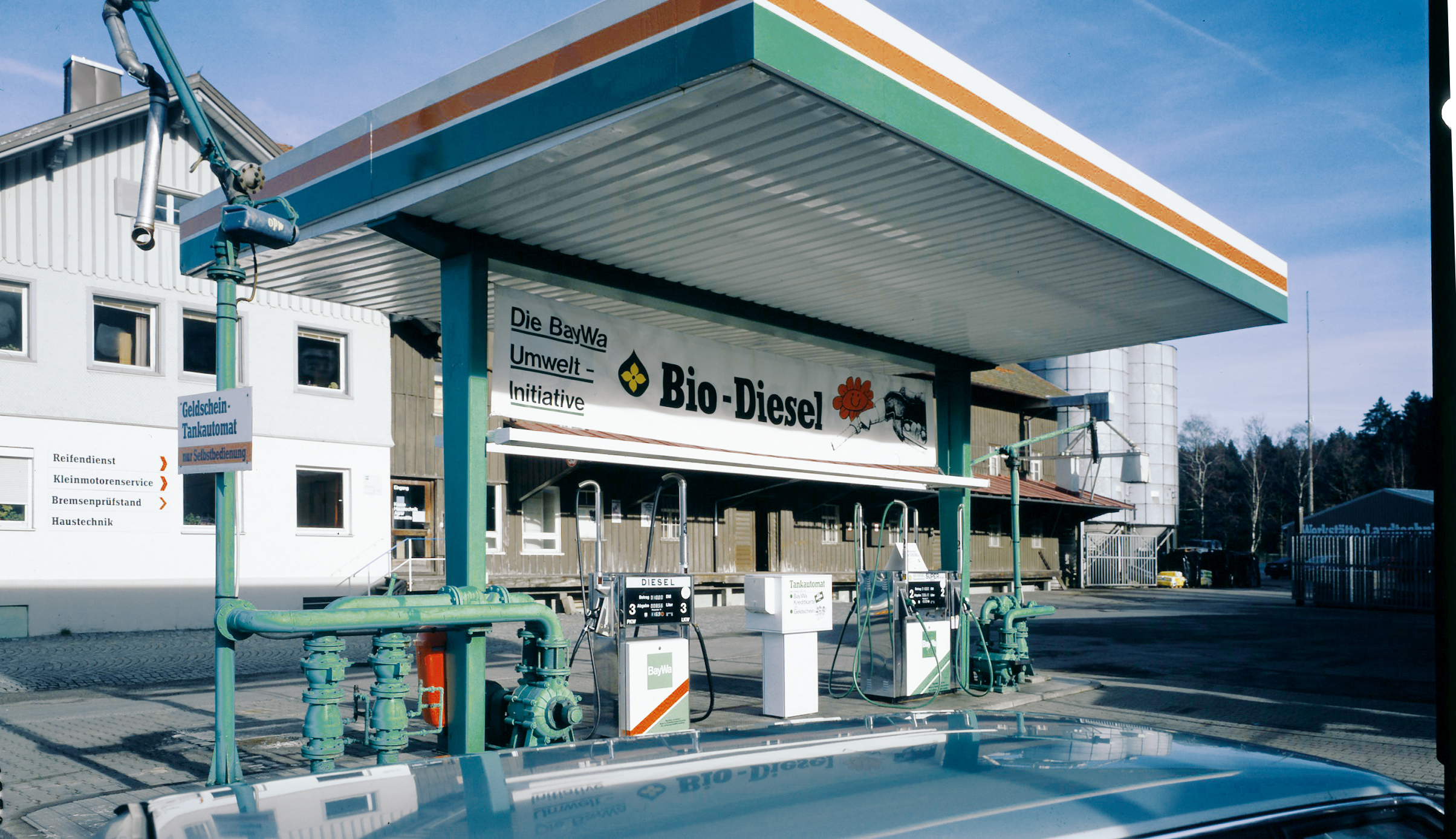
BayWa biodiesel filling station

In addition to heating oil, BayWa also sells other fuels and lubricants. Its range also includes energy sources such as wood pellets and heating solutions, for example for classic oil and gas heating systems. The company also issues a fuel card for private and commercial customers that are accepted at numerous filling stations and at an increasing number of charging stations for electric cars. BayWa is also active as an infrastructure provider, operating e-charging stations and LNG filling stations as well as billing systems. The renewable energy segment comprises the planning, development, and realization of projects in the field of wind and solar energy, as well as their sale and operational management, and the marketing of the energy generated. The Group is active in America, Europe, Asia, and Australia.

=== Agriculture ===
The BayWa Group covers the entire value chain of the agricultural industry, i.e. from the production to the marketing of agricultural products. It does not operate any agricultural businesses itself. The range of services includes the trading and logistics of raw materials as well as the sale of operating resources and feedstuffs. It also sells new and used machinery for agricultural operations, including maintenance and repair. Internationally, BayWa is one of the most important players in the fruit and vegetable trade and markets pome fruit, tropical fruit, and other fruit and vegetable products worldwide.

=== Building Materials ===
BayWa's building materials trade is aimed at private builders, commercial contractors, craft businesses, and municipalities. It is handled via retail and wholesale. The product range includes building materials for building construction and civil engineering, new construction as well as renovation and modernization, and also for gardening and landscaping.

=== Innovation & Digitalization ===
The Innovation & Digitalization Segment comprises BayWa's activities in e-business and digital farming. The Group prepares data for agriculture so that it is available for practical use in the field. Examples of this are area-accurate forecasts of nutrient and water requirements or harvest forecasts. The company relies primarily on satellite data for this purpose.

== Corporate and social responsibility ==
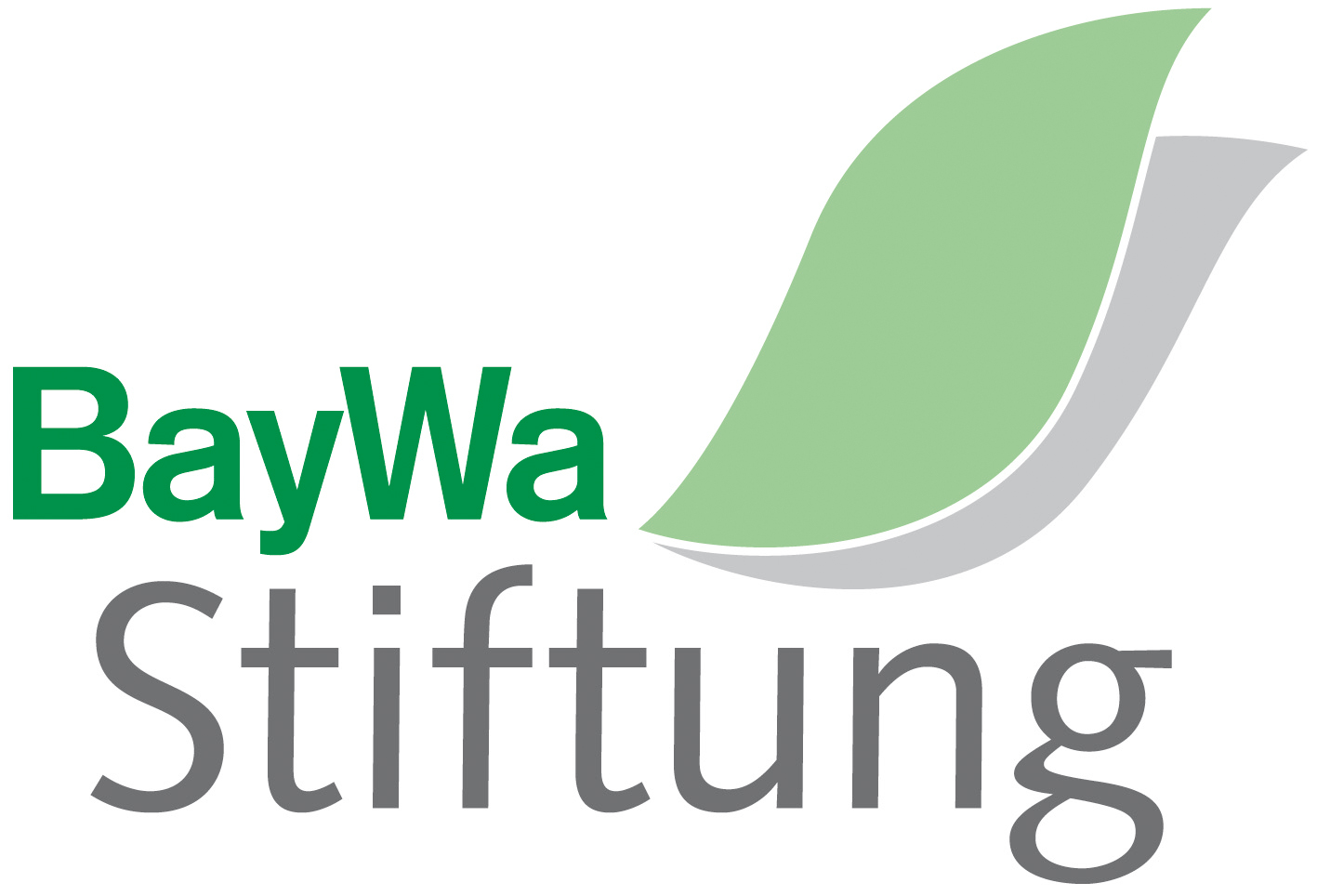
Logo of the BayWa Foundation

The BayWa Foundation was established by BayWa in 1998 to support educational projects. The focus is on healthy nutrition and regenerative energy. One example is the establishment of school gardens to improve the nutritional behavior of elementary school children. A special feature is that every donation received by the foundation is doubled. Since the 2014/2015 season, BayWa has been the official main and jersey sponsor of the basketball department of FC Bayern Munich. This is BayWa's largest sports sponsorship to date. The cooperation was most recently extended for another year in July 2020. BayWa also supports other campaigns and exhibitions of the club, including in the area of social responsibility and art.
