= Claus Sendlinger =

German businessman

- Born: 1963 (age 62–63); Augsburg, Germany
- Occupation: Entrepreneur
- Known for: Founder and former CEO of Design Hotels AG; co-founder of Slow

Claus Sendlinger (born 1963) is the founder and former CEO of Design Hotels AG (Börse München: LBA) and co-founder of Slow. Sendlinger founded Design Hotels in 1993, along with J. Peter Schweitzer. Until 2018, Sendlinger was the CEO & president of Design Hotels, a publicly traded hospitality services company representing a network of more than 170 independently owned hotels in 40 countries and with offices in London, Barcelona, New York City, Singapore, Bali, Tokyo and Perth in addition to its headquarters in Berlin, after taking up this role from Co-founder J. Peter Schweitzer in 2001. After leading Design Hotels for 25 years, Sendlinger stepped down.

== Biography ==
Born in Augsburg, Germany, in 1963, Sendlinger began his career in event planning and PR for hotels and clubs. In 1987, he founded CO-ORDINATES GmbH, an incentives and events agency. This formed the basis for the foundation of lebensart global networks AG as a marketing and technology provider for the hospitality industry based in Germany.

In 2002, Condé Nast Traveler named Sendlinger in their Top 50 list of world tourism experts, in the category of most creative and innovative international tourism entrepreneurs.

== See also ==
- Design Hotels AG
- Slow
