= Sendlinger Tor =

City gate in Munich, Germany

Coordinates: 48.133965°N 11.567624°E

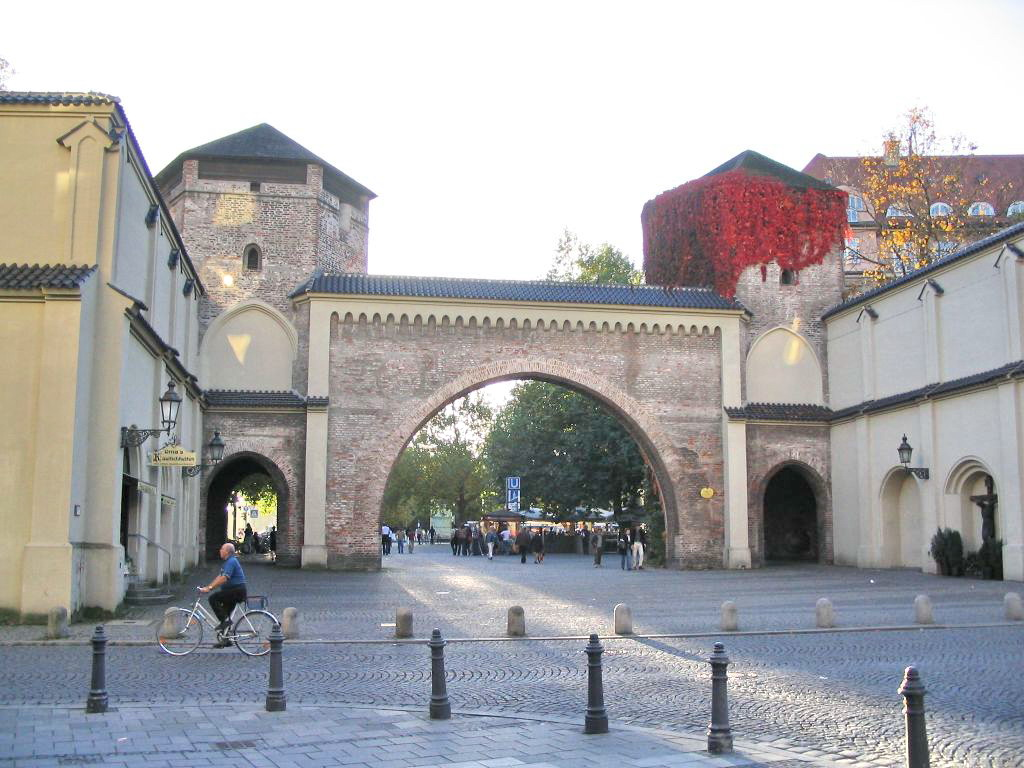
Sendlinger Tor, 2004

The Sendlinger Tor (translated: Sendling Gate) is a city gate at the southern extremity of the historic old town area of Munich. It served as a fortification for defence and is one of Munich's three remaining gothic town gates (the other two being the Isartor and the Karlstor).

== Location ==
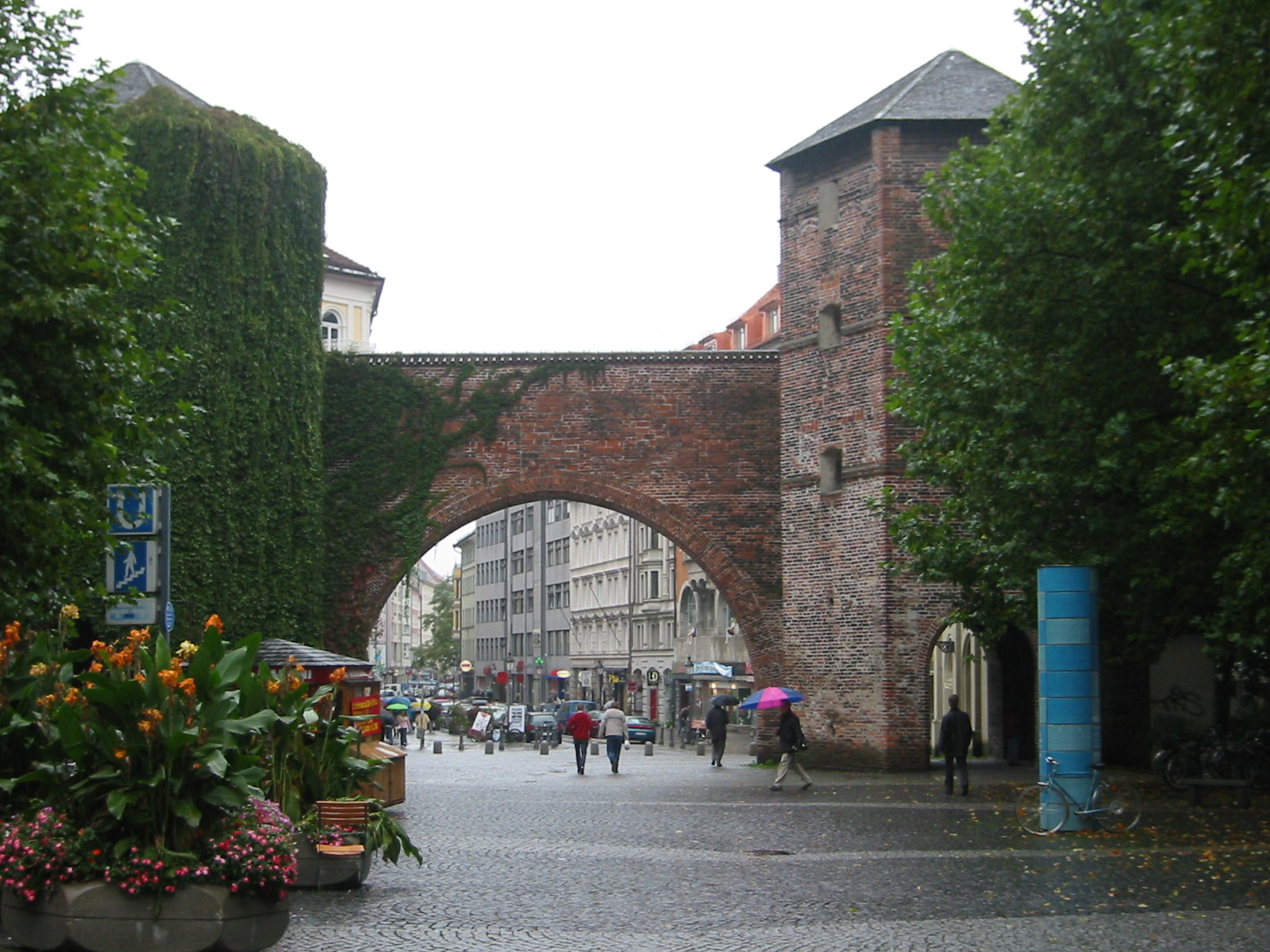
The gate seen from Sendlinger-Tor-Platz

Sendlinger Tor (located at Sendlinger Str 49) lies at the southern end of Sendlinger Strasse, the north–south thoroughfare through Munich's old town. Sendlinger Tor thus separates the old city from the Isar suburb. Sendlinger Tor is at an altitude of 525 metres (1,722 ft) above sea level.

== History ==
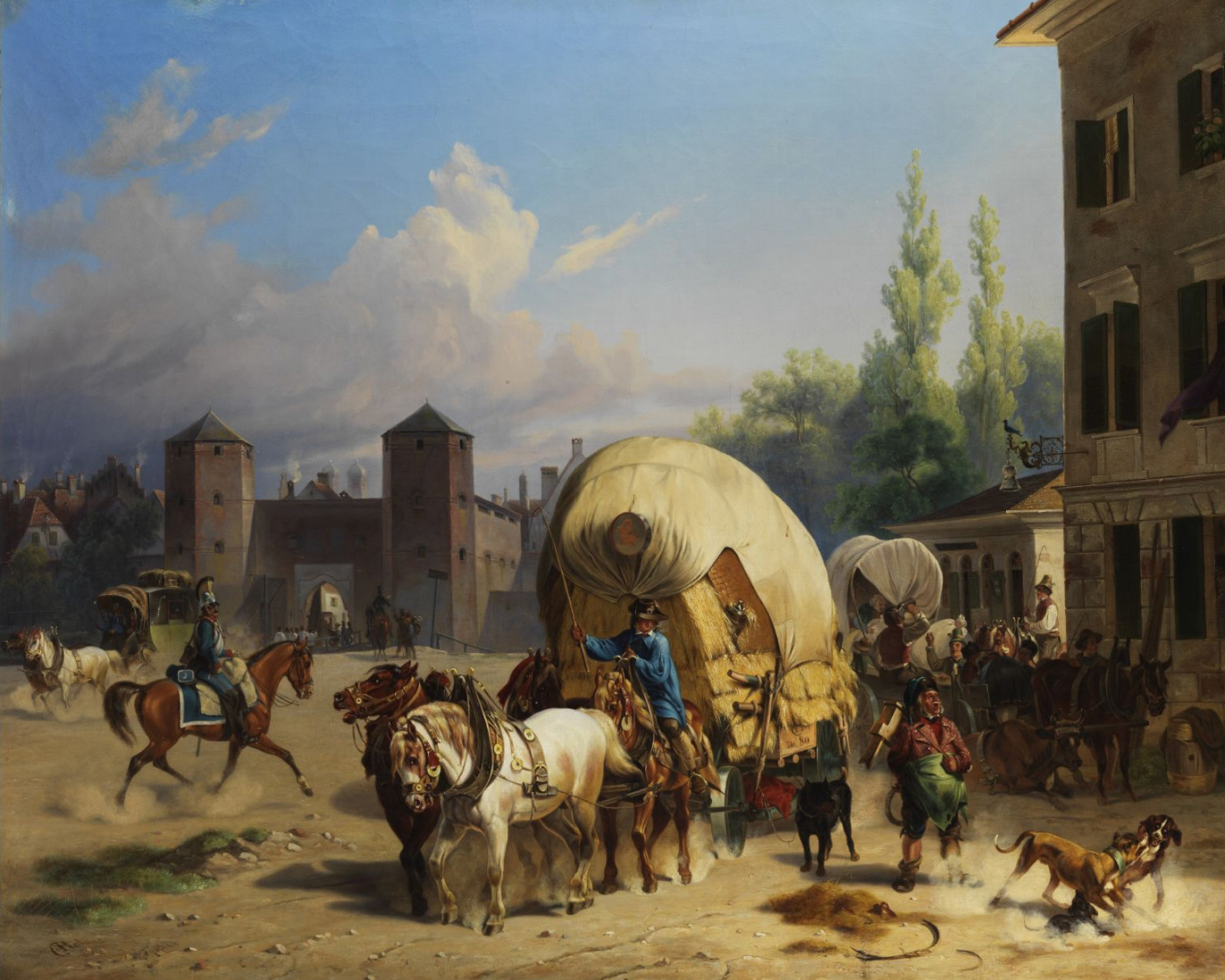
Colourful Bustle in Front of Sendlinger Tor in Munich (1840)

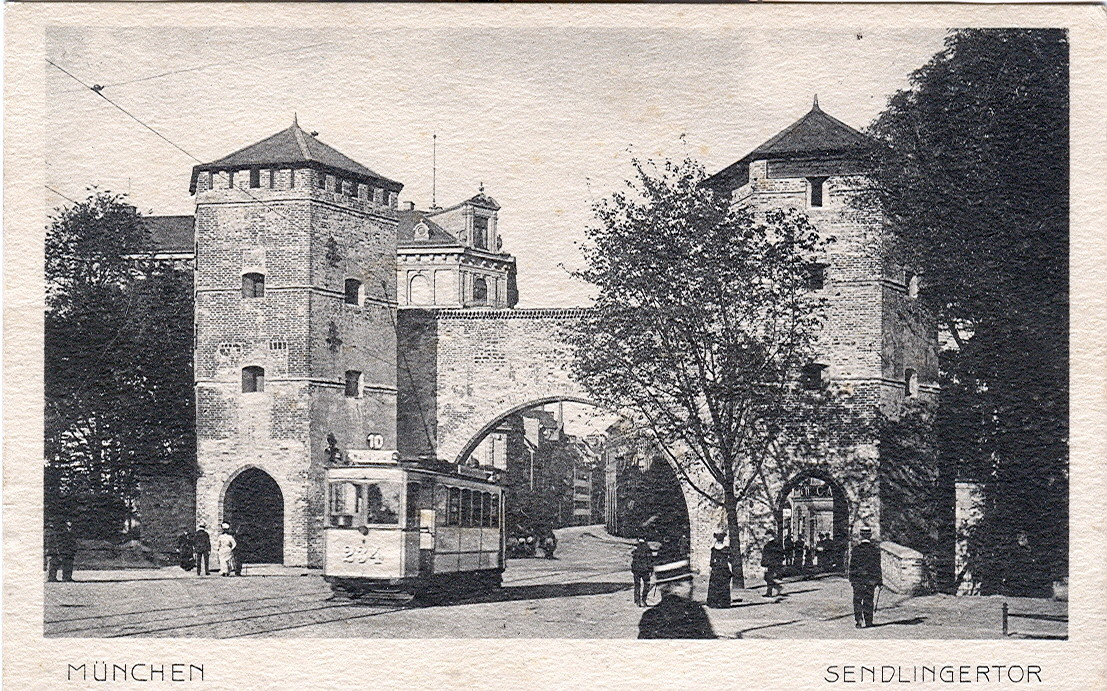
Sendlinger Tor, 1918

As part of the great urban expansion by Ludwig the Bavarian (from 1285 to 1337), a second city wall with four town gates was built, of which Sendlinger Tor was one. In 1318, Sendlinger Tor was first mentioned as a starting point for the road to Italy, but probably existed earlier. Originally, there was only the distinctive central tower gate (typical of the Munich city gates of the time). In 1420 that was supplemented by the two flanking towers, which were required to terminate the end of the outer city wall properly.

In 1808 the central tower was demolished. In 1860 a restoration of the two remaining Medieval flanking towers and the wall with three arches took place. In 1906, these original three arches were replaced by the one large single arch.

In the Second World War, the gate was barely damaged. It was refurbished in the 1980s. On the Sendlinger Tor, a remnant of the old city wall can still be seen, which previously went up the Herzog-Wilhelm-Str.

== Transport connections ==
Sendlinger Tor station is located at Sendlinger-Tor-Platz, served by six U-Bahn lines and five tram lines. The square is bordered by Herzog-Wilhelm-Straße, Lindwurmstraße, and Sonnenstraße.

For Sendlinger Straße, which can be seen through the gate, a conversion to a pedestrian zone was called for during "Park(ing) Day 2007"; this was completed in two construction phases by 2019.
