= Denning =

Denning can refer to:

== Places ==
- Denning (lunar crater), a crater located on the far side of the Moon
- Denning (Martian crater), a crater on Mars
- Denning (Munich), a district of Munich, Germany
- Denning, New York, a town in Ulster County, New York, US
- Denning, Arkansas, a town in Franklin County, Arkansas, US
- Denning Township, Franklin County, Illinois, US

== People ==
- Blaine Denning (1930–2016), American basketball player
- Chris Denning (1941–2022), British disc jockey
- Dorothy E. Denning (born 1945), American information security researcher
- Rev. James Denning (1814–1875), Anglican clergyman
- Margaret B. Denning (1856–1935), American missionary and temperance worker
- Norman Denning (1904–1979), British officer of the Royal Navy and brother of Reginald and Tom Denning
- Peter J. Denning (born 1942), American computer scientist
- Sir Reginald Denning (1894–1990), British army officer
- Richard Denning (1914–1998), American actor
- Richard J Denning (born 1967), British author
- Robert Denning (1927–2005), American socialite and interior designer
- Scott Denning, American atmospheric scientist
- Sheila Mary Denning (1920–2015), British artist
- Tom Denning, Baron Denning (1899–1999), British lawyer and judge
- Troy Denning (born 1958), American writer
- William A. Denning (1817–1856) American jurist and politician
- William Frederick Denning (1848–1931), British amateur astronomer

== Other ==
- Denning, a form of hibernation
- Denning Manufacturing, Australian bus manufacturer

== See also ==
- Dening (disambiguation)
- Dunning (disambiguation)
