= Holbeinstraße =

Street in Munich, Germany

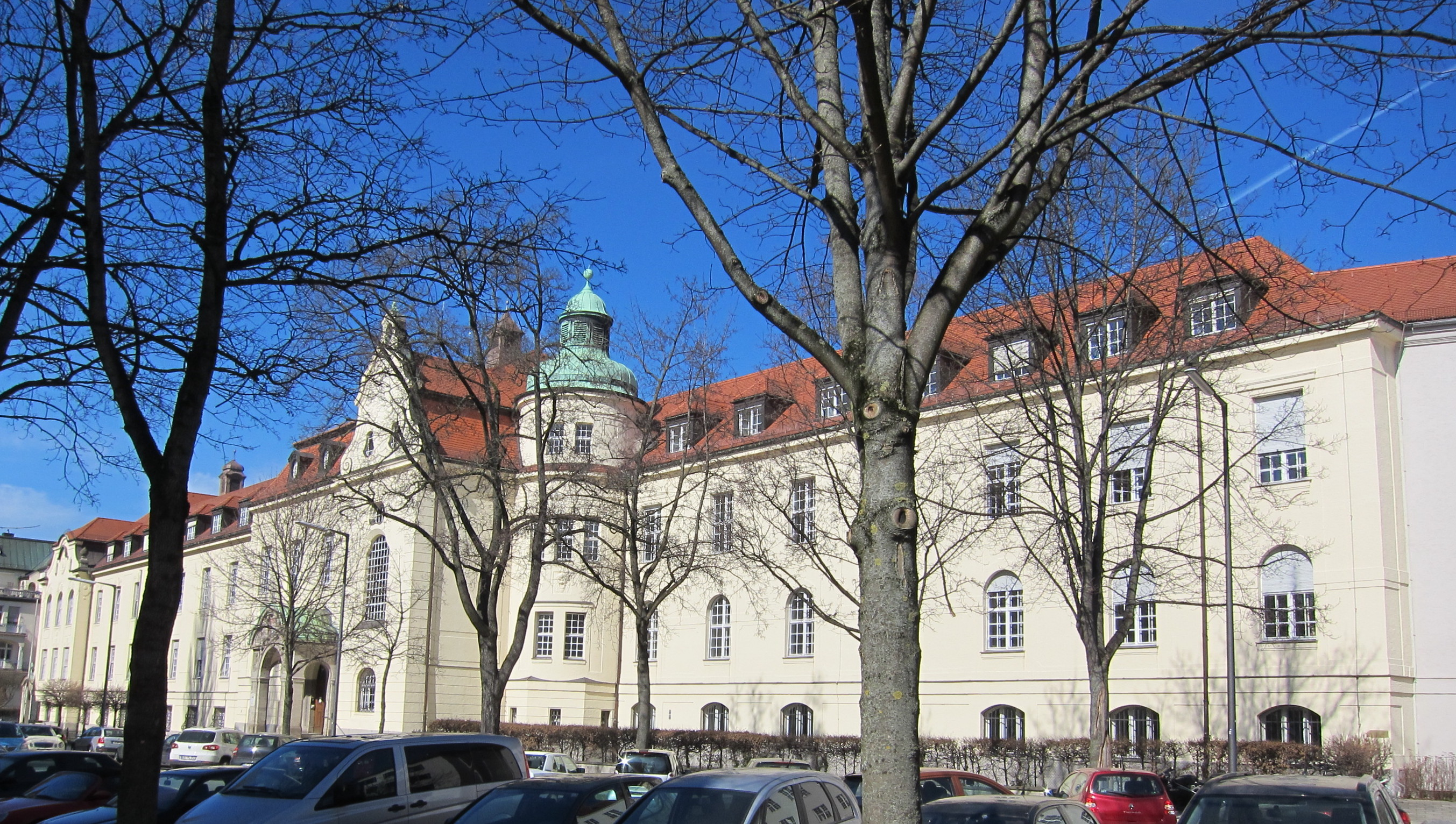
- Holbeinstraße 9 (former National Insurance Institution from Upper Bavaria)

- Location within Germany
- Namesake: Hans Holbein the Younger
- Location: Munich
- Postal code: 81679
- Nearest metro station: Westendstraße (U4)
- Coordinates: 48.14316°N 11.60138°E
- Major junctions: Ismaninger Straße, Friedrich-Herschel-Straße, Schumannstraße, Lamontstraße, Possartstraße, Keplerstraße, Beetzstraße

The Holbeinstraße is a city center street in the Munich district of Bogenhausen.

== Route ==
The road leads through the Ensemble Altbogenhausen. It branches off to the right at the height of Ismaninger Straße 65, and heads east, where it is lined mostly from, Gründerzeit style, rental buildings until the Schumannstraße. On the north side of the road, until the Lamontstraße, it is lined by administrative and commercial buildings (formerly the National Insurance Institution, now commercially used). East of the Lamontstraße, the Holbeinstraße is built up with villas. From the Possartstraße, its route is offset by a few meters to the south; on the north side is then the open fields of the Shakespeareplatz. Between Keplerstraße and the end of the street at the Beetzstraße, it is lined once again on both sides with residential villa development. Opposing the end of the road is the property of the Max-Josef-Stift on Mühlbaurstraße.

== Designation ==
After the incorporation of Bogenhausen in 1892, and in connection with the extensive development of the eastern portion of Bogenhausen due to the urban expansion planning under Theodor Fischer, the street bears its name after the painter Hans Holbein the Younger. The name of the street dates back to 1899.

== Architectural historical monuments on Holbeinstraße ==
- No. 1 Rental house, neo-baroque corner building with corner tower, 1901 by Max Kirschner and Sigmund Waidenschlager
- No. 2 Neo-Baroque rental house with corner tower, 1903 by Georg Müller
- No. 3/5 Douplex rental house, Art Nouveau with loggia / balcony group, by Max Kirschner, 1909/10
- No. 4 Rental House, Art Nouveau, by Sigmund Waidenschlager and Max Kirschner, 1907
- No. 6 Rental house, Art Nouveau, by Sigmund Waidenschlager and Max Kirschner, 1907
- No. 7 Rental house, Art Nouveau, by Emil Ludwig, 1903
- No. 8 Rental house, Art Nouveau, by Sigmund Waidenschlager and Max Kirschner, 1907: Noteworthy of its very clear breakdown of the house in the portion containing the staircase and utility room areas (left) and the tract with the representative living spaces (right).
- No. 9 Former National Insurance Institution of Upper Bavaria, 1905, by Heilmann & Littmann
- No. 10 Rental house, Art Nouveau, by Paul Vincent Paravicini, built in 1900 for the director Gustav Nassauer. One of the earlier completely unhistorical, emphasized and unconventionally asymmetrical residential buildings in Munich.
- No. 12 Rental house, Art Nouveau, by Lorenz Kirschner, 1911
- No. 14 rental house, Art Nouveau corner building, by Sigmund Waidenschlager, 1910
- No. 17 Villa, around 1910
- No. 22/24 Douplex rental house in baroque forms, around 1910/20
- No. 26 Villa, Hipped Roof Corner in Historicizing Forms, Early 20th C.
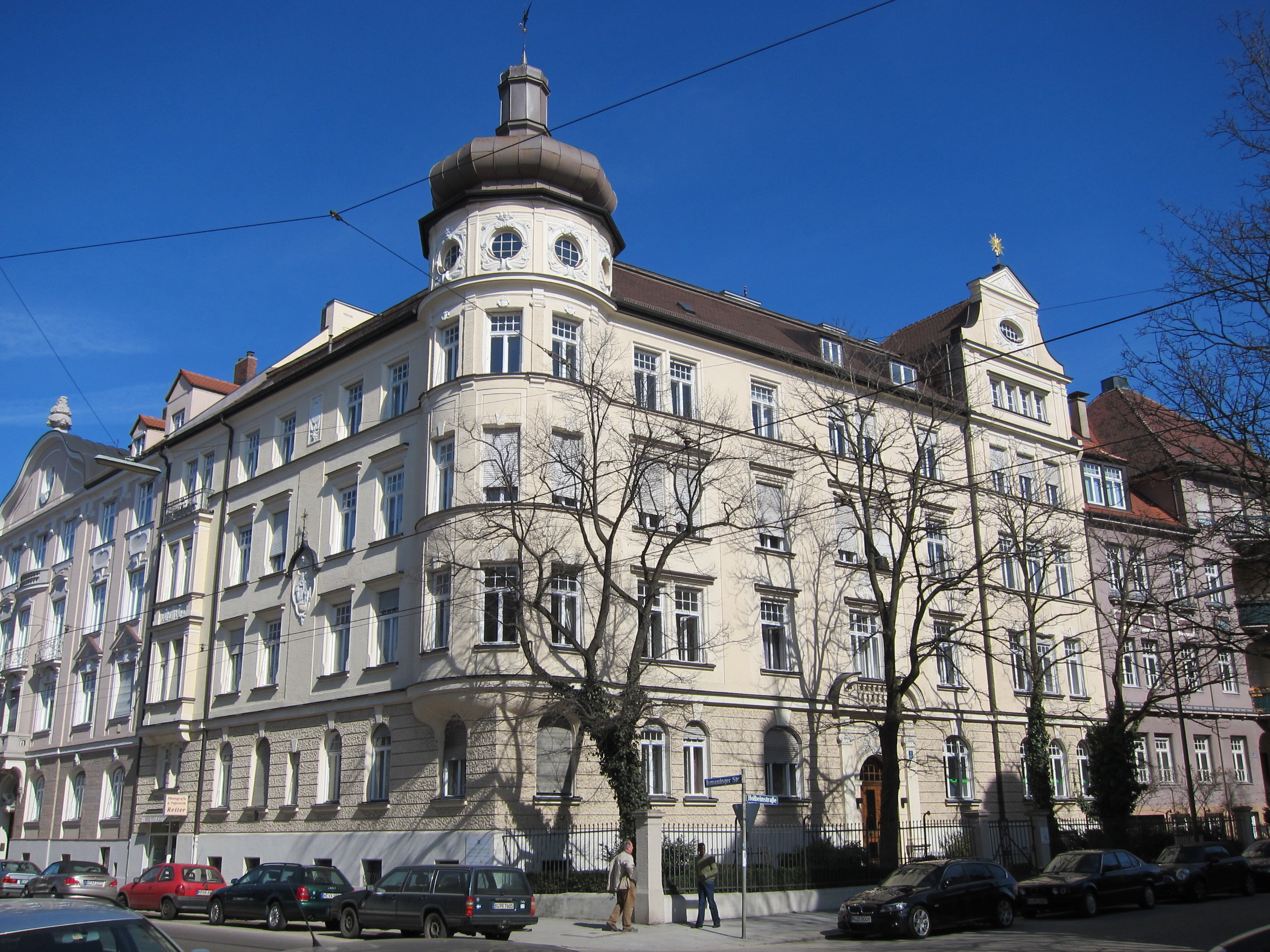
House No. 1

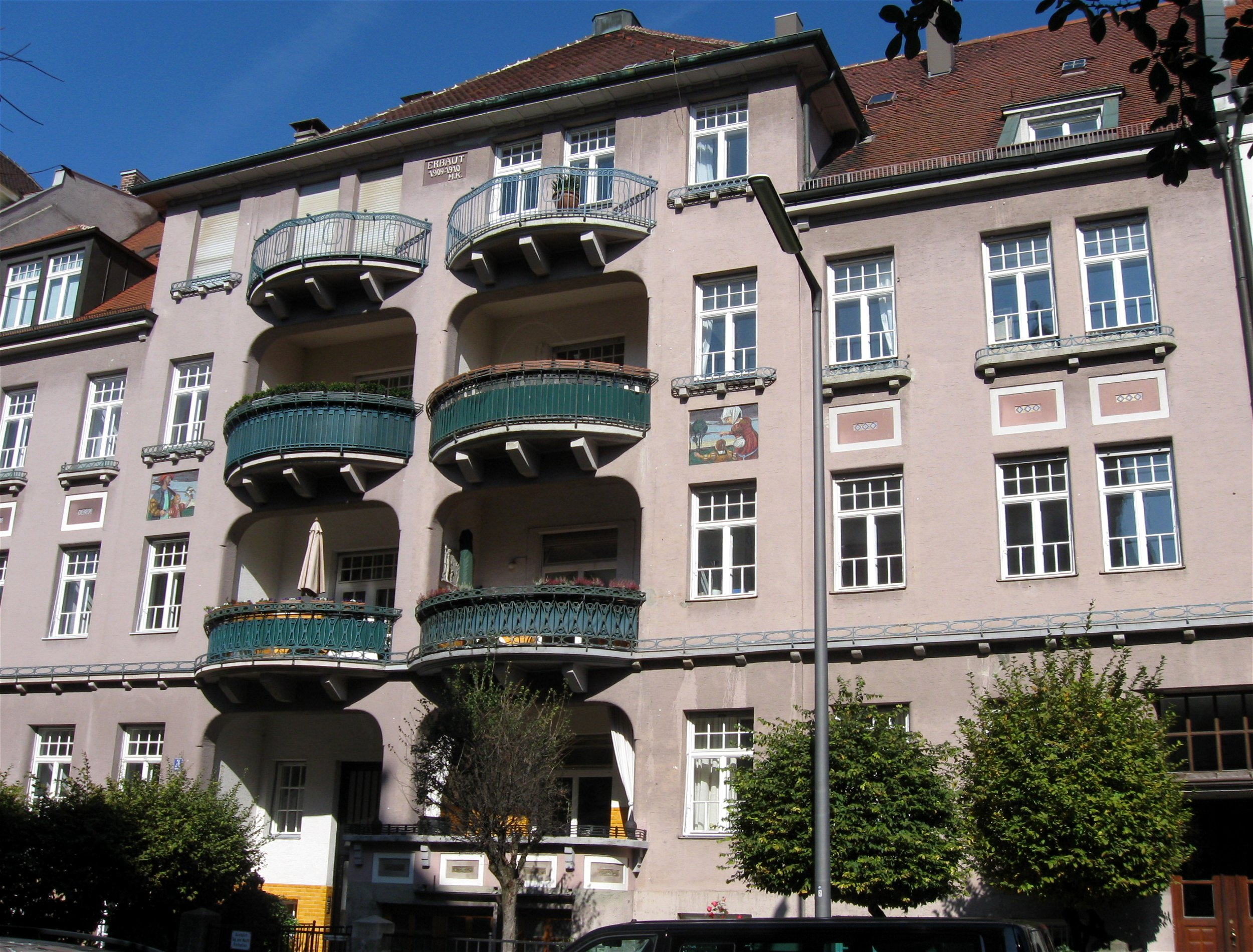
House No. 3

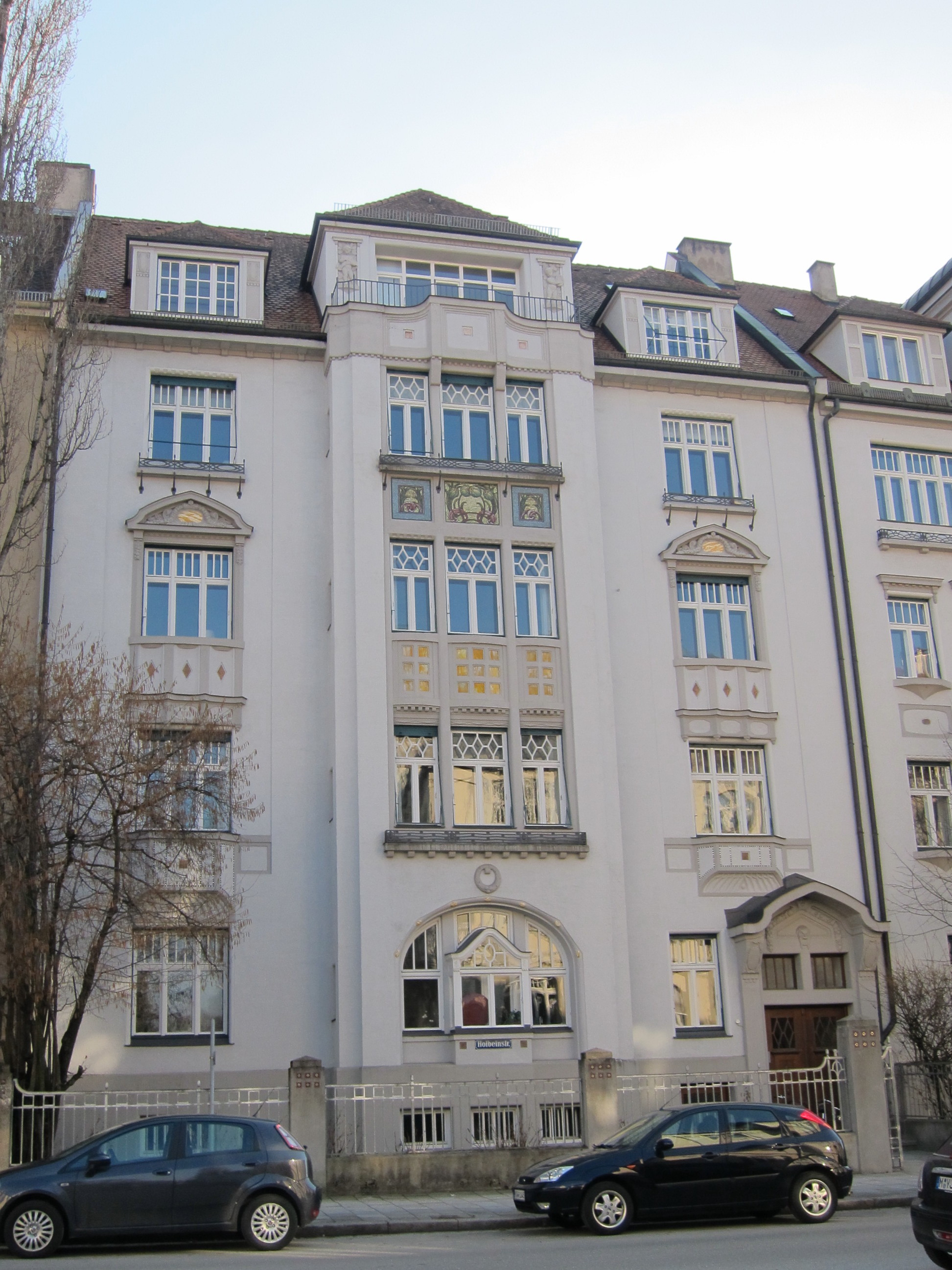
House No. 6

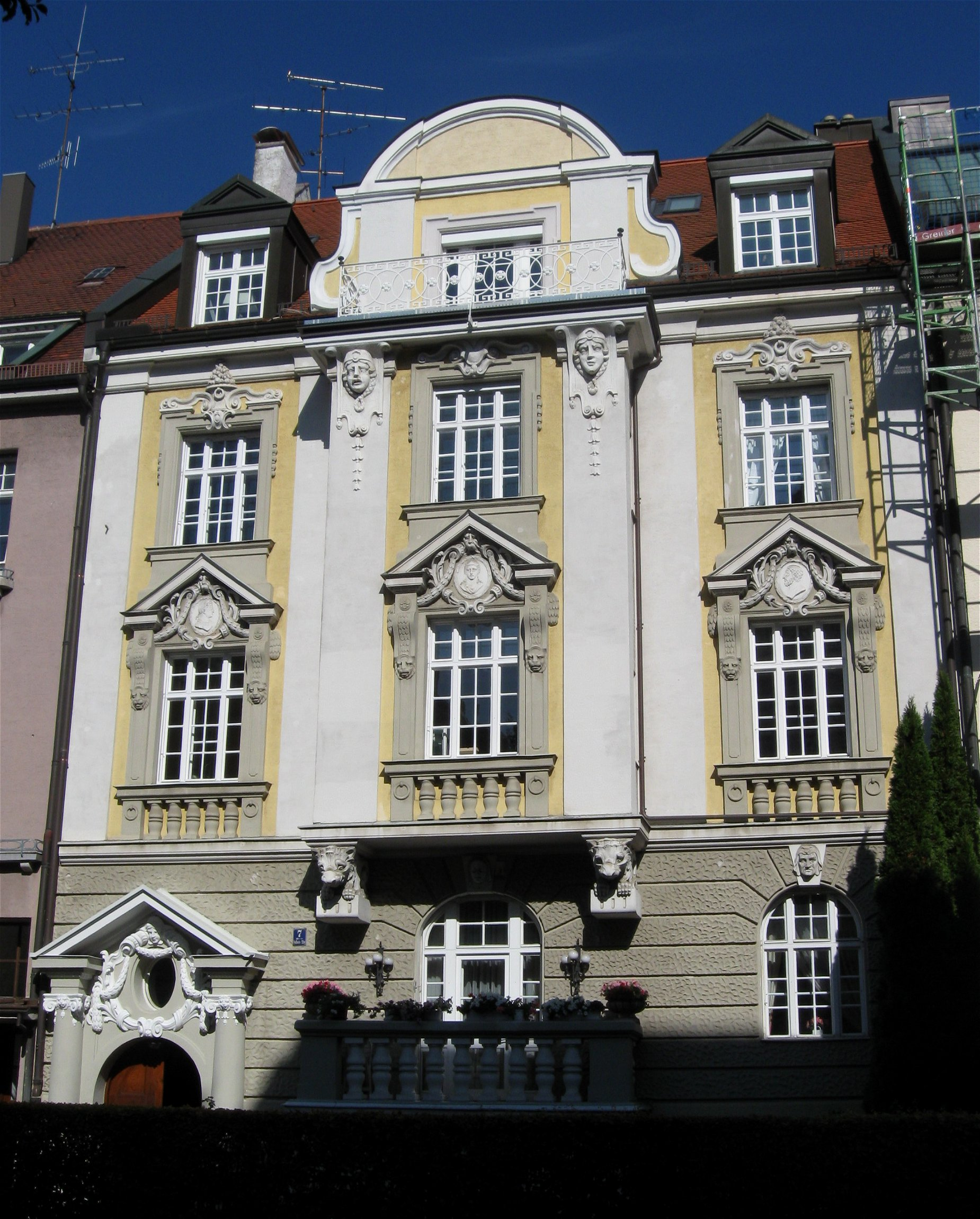
House No. 7

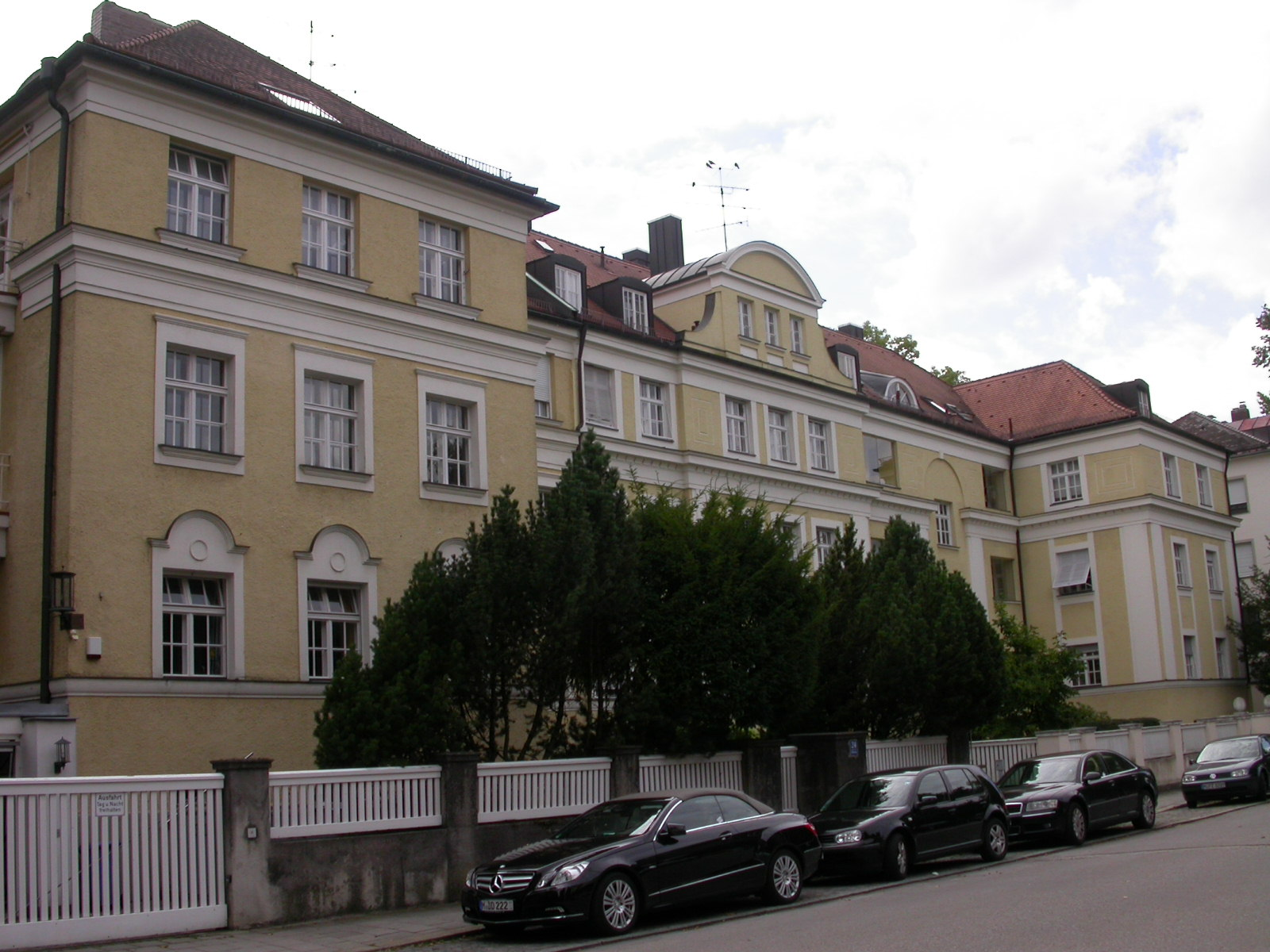
Douplex rental house Holbeinstraße 22/24
