= Dunning =

Dunning may refer to:

== Places ==
- Dunning, Chicago, Illinois, United States, a community area
- Dunning, Nebraska, United States, a village
- Dunning Creek, Pennsylvania
- Dunning, Perth and Kinross, Scotland, a small village
  - Dunning railway station

== Other uses ==
- Dunning (surname), a surname
- Baron Dunning, a title in the peerage of the United Kingdom
- Dunning baronets, a title in the Baronetage of the United Kingdom
- Dunning (process), the process of methodically communicating with customers to ensure the collection of accounts receivable

== See also ==
- Dunning School, a historiographical school of thought regarding the Reconstruction period of American history
- Dunning House, Wawayanda, New York, United States
- Dunning–Kruger effect
