= Bogenhausen =

Borough of Munich, Germany

- Part of Munich
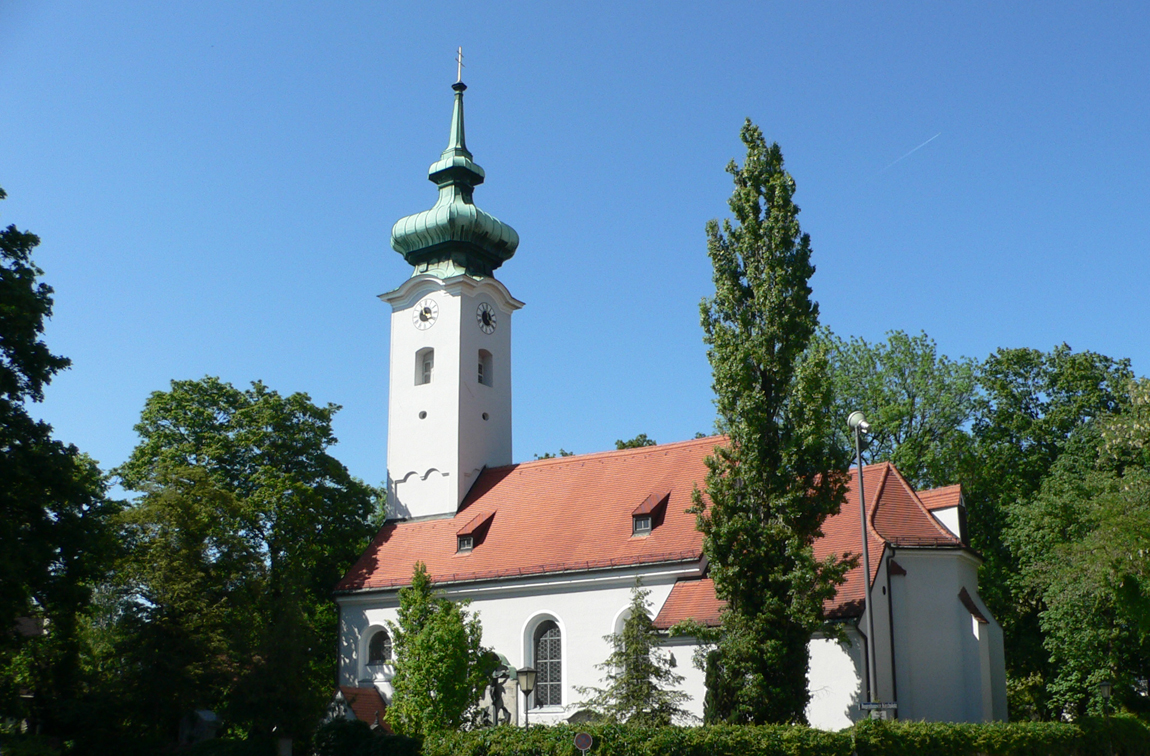
- St George’s Church

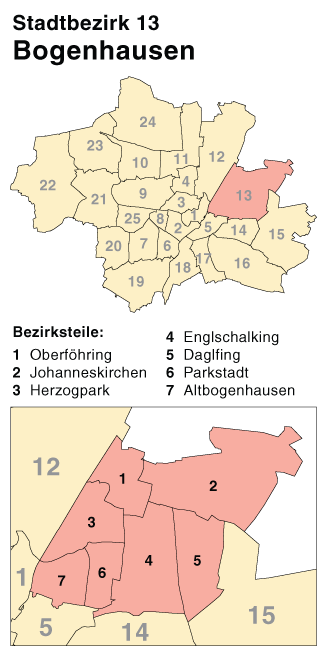
- Location of Bogenhausen within Munich
- Interactive map of Bogenhausen
- Location within Germany Location within Bavaria
- Country: Germany
- State: Bavaria
- City: Munich

Area
  - Total: 23.71 km^{2} (9.15 sq mi)

Population
  - Total: 94,337
  - Density: 3,979/km^{2} (10,310/sq mi)
- Time zone: UTC+01:00 (CET)
  - Summer (DST): UTC+02:00 (CEST)
- Postal codes: 81675, 81677, 81679, 81925, 81927, 81929
- Dialling codes: 089

Bogenhausen (German pronunciation: [ˈboːɡn̩haʊzn̩]; Central Bavarian: Bognhausn) is the 13th borough of Munich, Germany. It is the geographically the third largest borough of Munich and comprises the city's north-eastern quarter, reaching from the Isar on the eastern side of the Englischer Garten to the city limits, bordering on Unterföhring to the north, Aschheim to the east and the Haidhausen borough to the south. In 1805 the Treaty of Bogenhausen was signed which allied Bavaria to Napoleonic France.

== Sub-divisions ==
=== Alt-Bogenhausen ===
Alt-Bogenhausen is the oldest part of Bogenhausen and is located between the river Isar to the west, the Prinzregentenstraße to the south and the Mittlerer Ring to the east and north. Alt-Bogenhausen is one of Munich's most desirable residential districts and has some of the highest quality housing in town which comes with the highest rental prices in Germany. The borough's main artery is Ismaninger Straße, connecting Prinzregentenstraße to the south with Mittlerer Ring in the north at Effnerplatz. The district is serviced by the tram lines 16 and 18 as well as the bus lines 54, 154, 100, 187, 188 and 189. The nearest Munich U-Bahn stations are Prinzregentenplatz to the south-east and Böhmerwaldplatz and Richard-Strauss-Straße to the east.

Many well known and wealthy Persons and families have houses in Alt-Bogenhausen for example Käfers (Feinkost Käfer), Sedelmayrs, Burdas, Samwers, Quanndts, Strauss and Roland Berger.

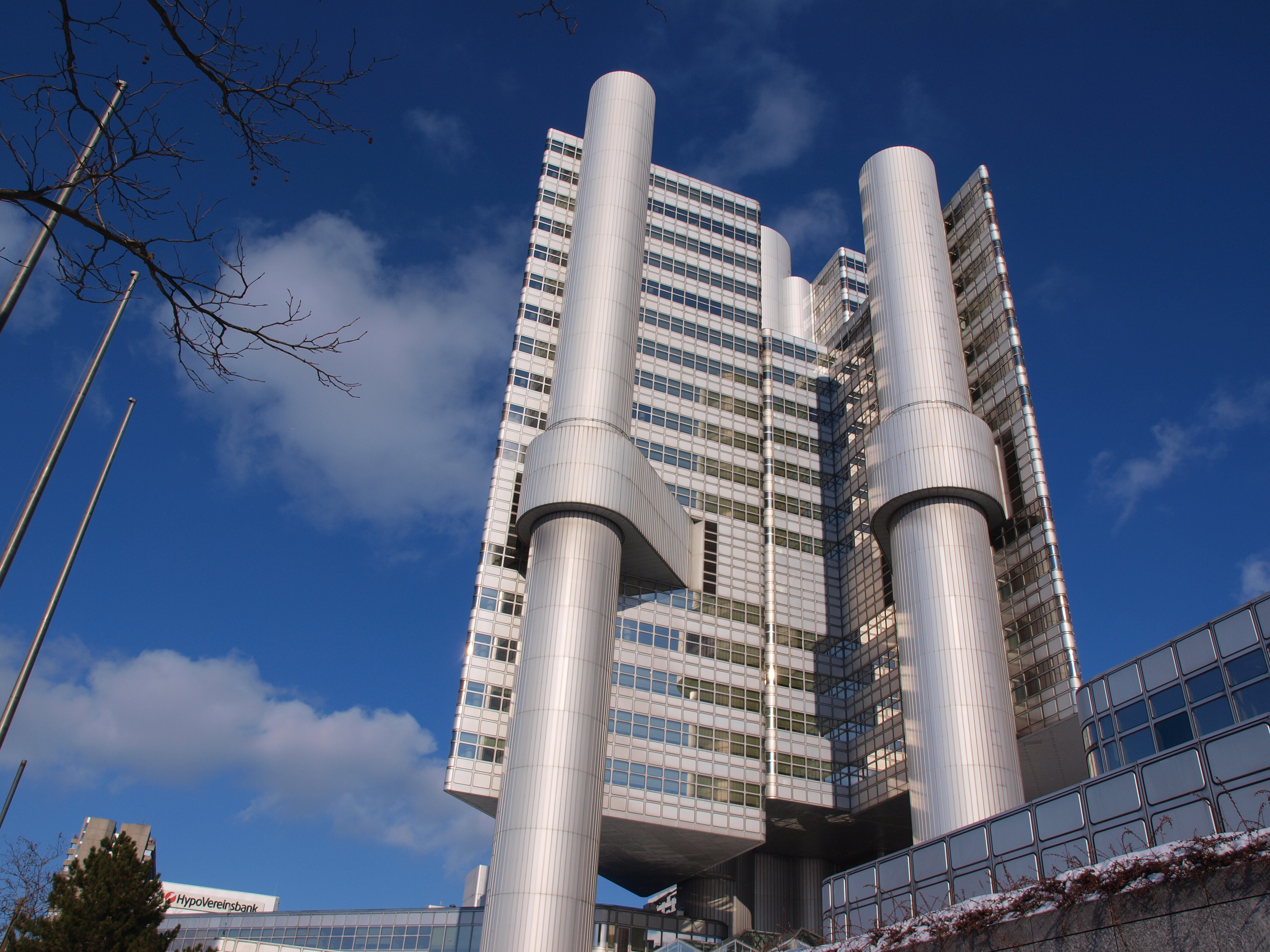
HVB Tower at Arabellapark

=== Herzogpark ===
Herzogpark is a quiet, secretive and highly exclusive residential area north of Alt-Bogenhausen, enclosed between the river Isar to the west and the Isarhochufer (lit. Isar cliff line). It is considered the most expensive and classy of Munich's numerous upscale residential districts, being the preferred living environment of the more reclusive commercial and political elite of the city (in contrast to film and sports stars, who either prefer the more urban districts of the inner city or the suburb of Grünwald). The whole area lies hidden between lush vegetation at the foot of the Isarhochufer, making it practically invisible from the outside - even from surrounding vantage points. The housing mostly consists of early-20th century villas as well as modern villas, built after World War II. While most of the district is free of car traffic, the Isarring highway, part of the Mittlerer Ring road system, divides the district into a northern and a southern part, leading to complaints by neighbours due to extensive car noise. The district is serviced by the bus line 187.

=== Priel, Oberföhring and St. Emmeram ===
Priel and Oberföhring are two residential quarters north of Alt-Bogenhausen and up the slope from Herzogpark, straddling Oberföhringer Straße, the districts' main traffic artery. The housing mostly consists of apartment buildings, affording a great view across the city. Oberföhring became part of Munich on 1 July 1913.

St. Emmeram is located on the river Isar and is a lush enclave of green. It is named after the St. Emmeram Chapel, which in turn is named after Otloh of St. Emmeram.

=== Johanneskirchen ===
Johanneskirchen is located east of the S8 train line. The district mostly consists of detached and semi-detached houses and has retained some of its rural character. It is serviced by the at the Johanneskirchen S-Bahn station.

=== Other quarters ===
The Bogenhausen borough also includes Arabellapark, Cosimapark, and Johanneskirchen to the north and north-east, as well as Englschalking, Denning, Zamdorf and Daglfing to the east. Especially Denning and Englschalking have developed into very idyllic and affluent suburban residential districts, making them extremely popular with well-off families who increasingly build new houses and villas there. Parts of Englschalking and almost the whole of Daglfing (which lies just outside Munich's official city limits, bordering Denning and Zamdorf), have retained a distinctive rural character, still featuring old farm buildings and fields. The contrast between these rural and the more modern suburban areas becomes apparent as soon as one crosses the Munich S-Bahn rails of Line, which practically coincides with Munich's eastern border in this area.

The other parts of the Stadtbezirk are a relatively newly developed mixture of commercial and residential areas. Even Arabellapark, which became Munich's first true cluster of high-rise buildings in the 80's, and Cosimapark, a post-World War II housing estate, were predominantly green fields until the 60's, but have been rapidly developed since then. You can find a mixture of offices, restaurants, shops, sports facilities and schools there, alternating with typical German apartment buildings from the 60's and 70's right up to newly built offerings, older and newer detached and semi-detached houses, villas, and quite a few authentic farm houses that survived modern developments. Additionally, multitudes of parks and playgrounds dot the whole area.
