= Englschalking =

Coordinates: 48°9′28″N 11°38′34″E

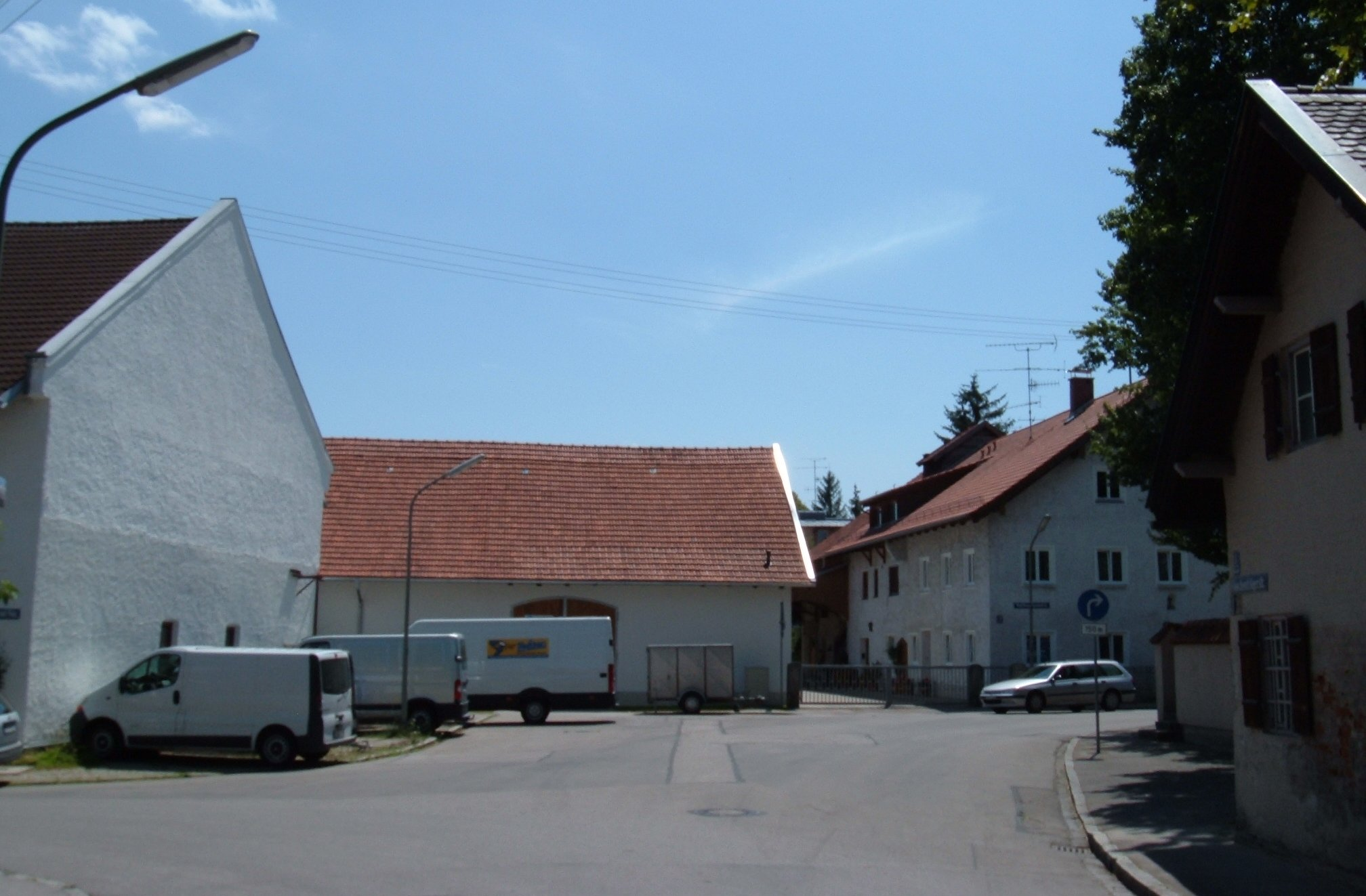
Historic town centre

Englschalking is a quarter of the Bavarian capital Munich and belongs to the district 13 Bogenhausen.

== Location ==
Englschalking is located relatively central in the district of Bogenhausen. The historic town centre lies northeast of the intersection Englschalkinger Straße/Ostpreußenstraße. In the east Englschalking has developed beyond the Munich East–Munich Airport railway to Max-Nadler-Straße, in the south it is bordered by Memeler Straße and Englschalkinger Straße, in the west by Cosimastraße and the area of the former Prinz-Eugen-Kaserne and in the north by Fideliostraße.

== History ==
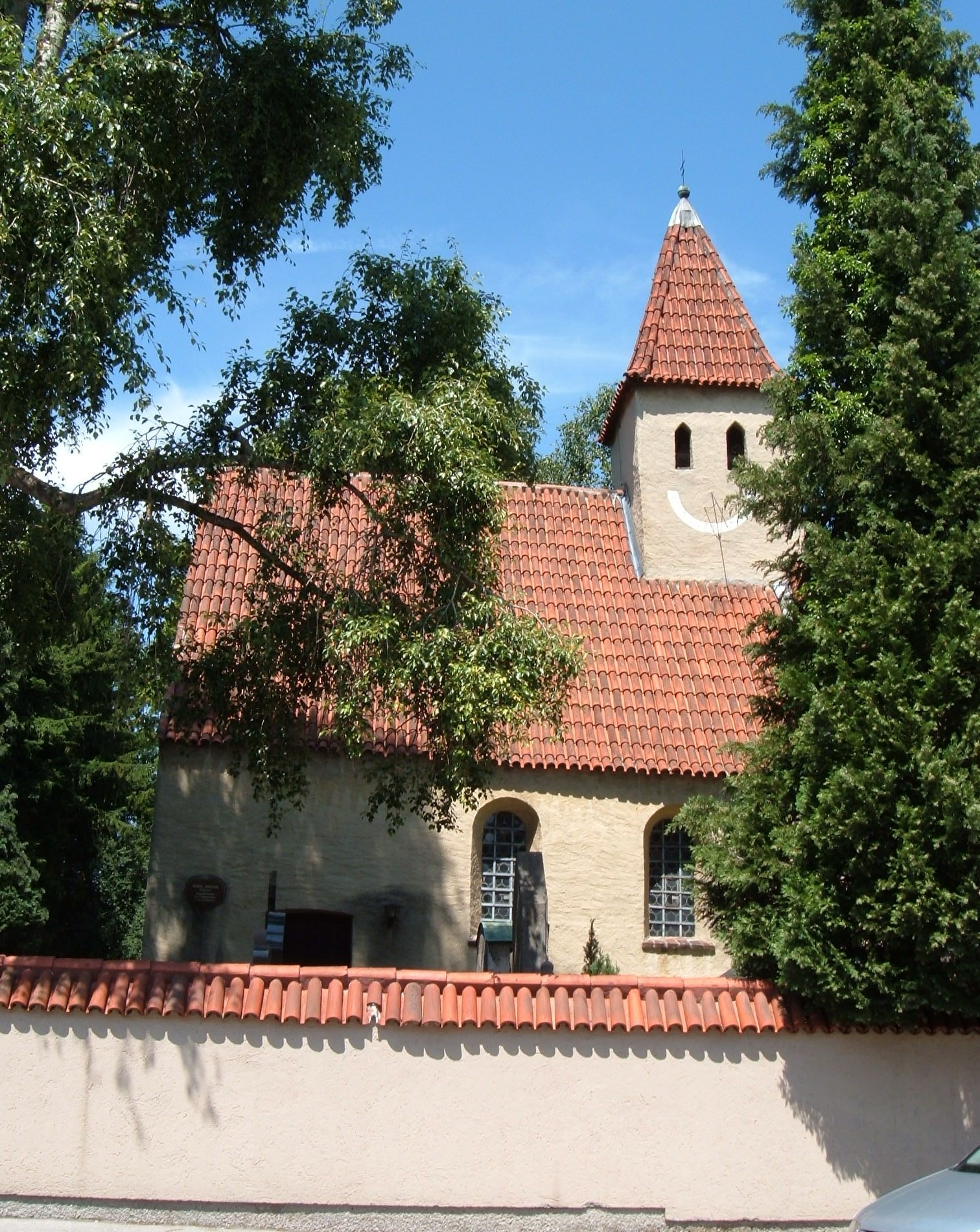
St. Nikolaus

In the area of Stegmühlstraße/Rambaldistraße, end Stone Age burials and an Early Bronze Age cemetery were discovered during excavations by the Bavarian State Office for Monument Protection in 1983. At the northern edge of Englschalking, south of Stegmühlstraße and east of the Munich S-Bahn, there was a settlement from the Early Middle Ages excavated in 1983. A residential house, an iron smelter, fountain, barns, stables and a cemetery in which 34 burials are documented were found. Jewellery that was found allowed historians to date it back to the 7th century. The foundation of Englschalking is assumed to date back to the 9th or 10th century. Englschalking was first mentioned in a document in 1231/1234 in the Bavarian Duke's urbarium (medieval register of ownership rights of a landlordate). The name is derived from Engelschalch (strict servant) or Englischalcho (also Engilschalko). In 1319 the hamlet of Englschaling was sold by Duke Ludwig to the Hochstift Freising, to which it belonged until secularization in 1803 as part of the county of Ismaning. When the community was included into Bavaria in 1818, Englschalking became part of the community of Daglfing.

Most of the buildings in the historic town centre date back to the end of the 19th century. Englschalking achieved some prosperity through the cultivation of moss and brickworks, in which the bricks used in construction in Munich were fired from the clay extracted here.

At the beginning of the 20th century, Englschalking developed into the central town of the municipality of Daglfing, partly because a municipal school was opened in 1896 on what is now Schnorr-von-Carolsfeld-Straße. Along with the municipality of Daglfing, Englschalking was incorporated into the city of Munich on 1 January 1930.

== Townscape ==
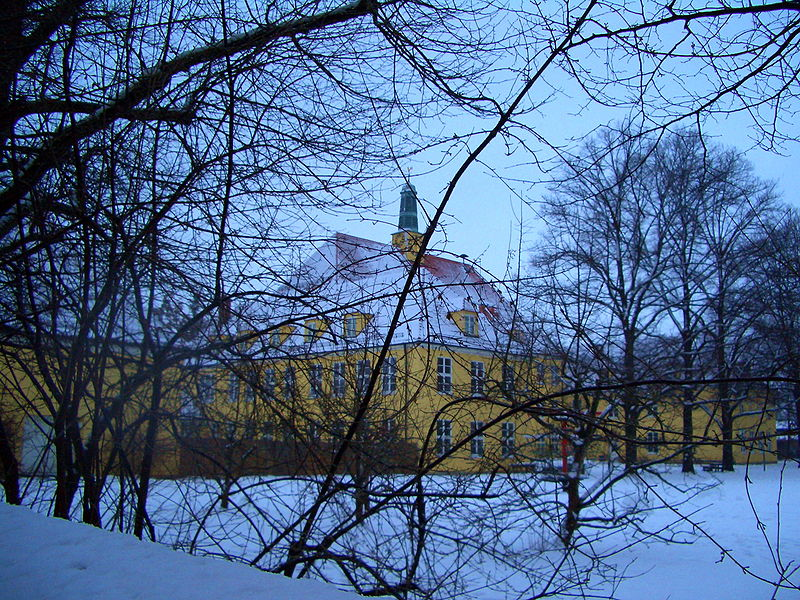
Primary school on Ostpreußenstraße

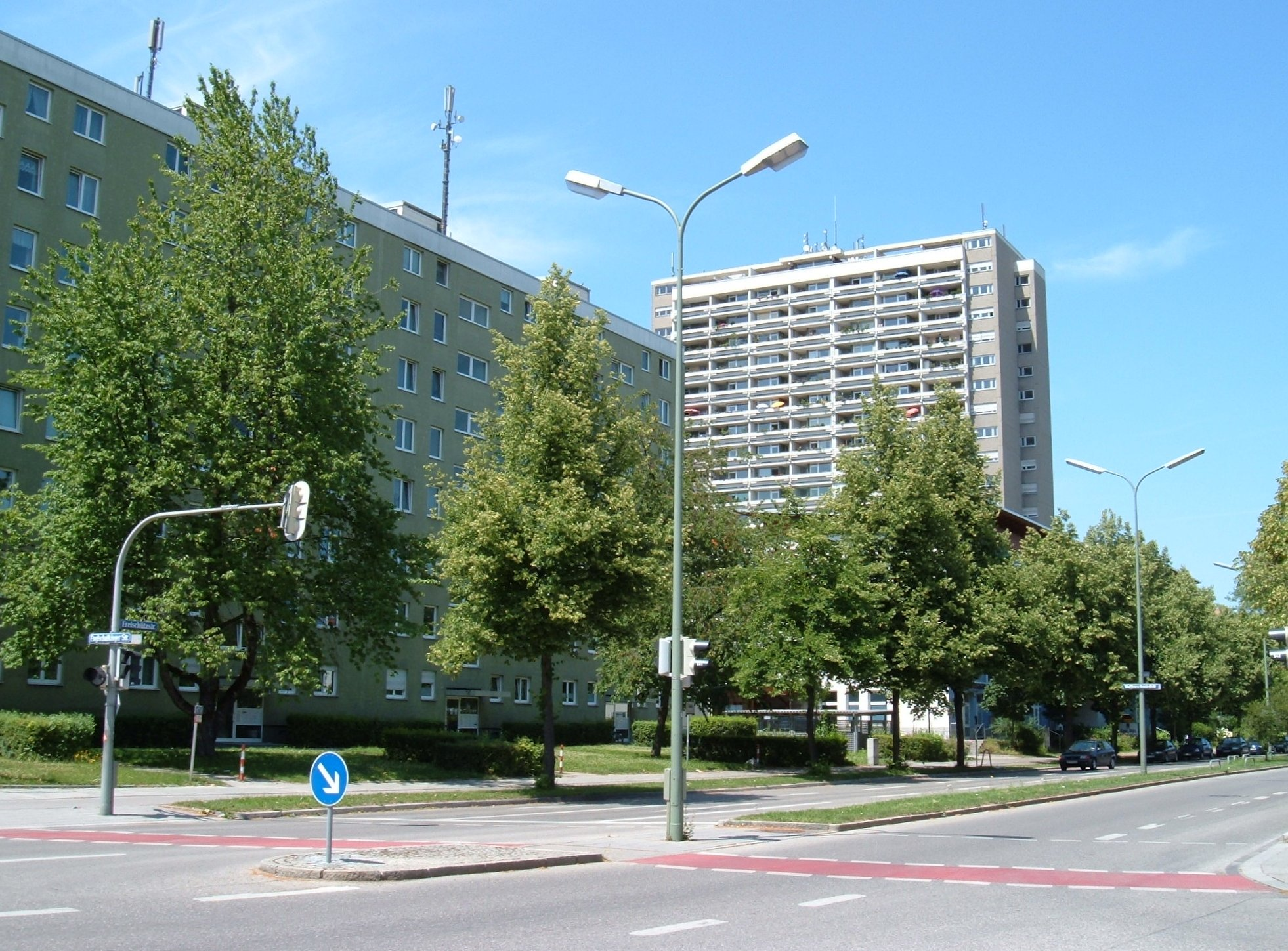
Fideliopark

The historic centre of Englschalking is a good example of a Haufendorf (ancient heap village). Large farmsteads stand in irregular arrangement around the church of Saint Nicholas, dating back to the 13th century. This village centre, which is a historically listed ensemble of buildings, is about the same size as the village was in the early 19th century.

South of the town centre and Englschalkinger Straße lies the large primary school building on Ostpreußenstraße, a 1930s work by Hermann Leitenstorfer. The original village school, built in the 19th century as a community school for the community of Daglfing on the eastern edge of the old town centre, now serves as a kindergarten. The parish church of Saint Emmeram is also located on Ostpreußenstraße.

To the west of the town centre lies Fideliopark, built in 1966-1970, with three to nineteen-storey apartment blocks. Further west is Cosimapark, built between 1964 and 1969, with four-storey apartment blocks and ten to nineteen-storey skyscrapers surrounded by balconies. On both sides of the railway line, extensive single-family house estates and estates with multi-family houses (such as the Barlowstraße estate) have been built since 1978.

== Transportation ==
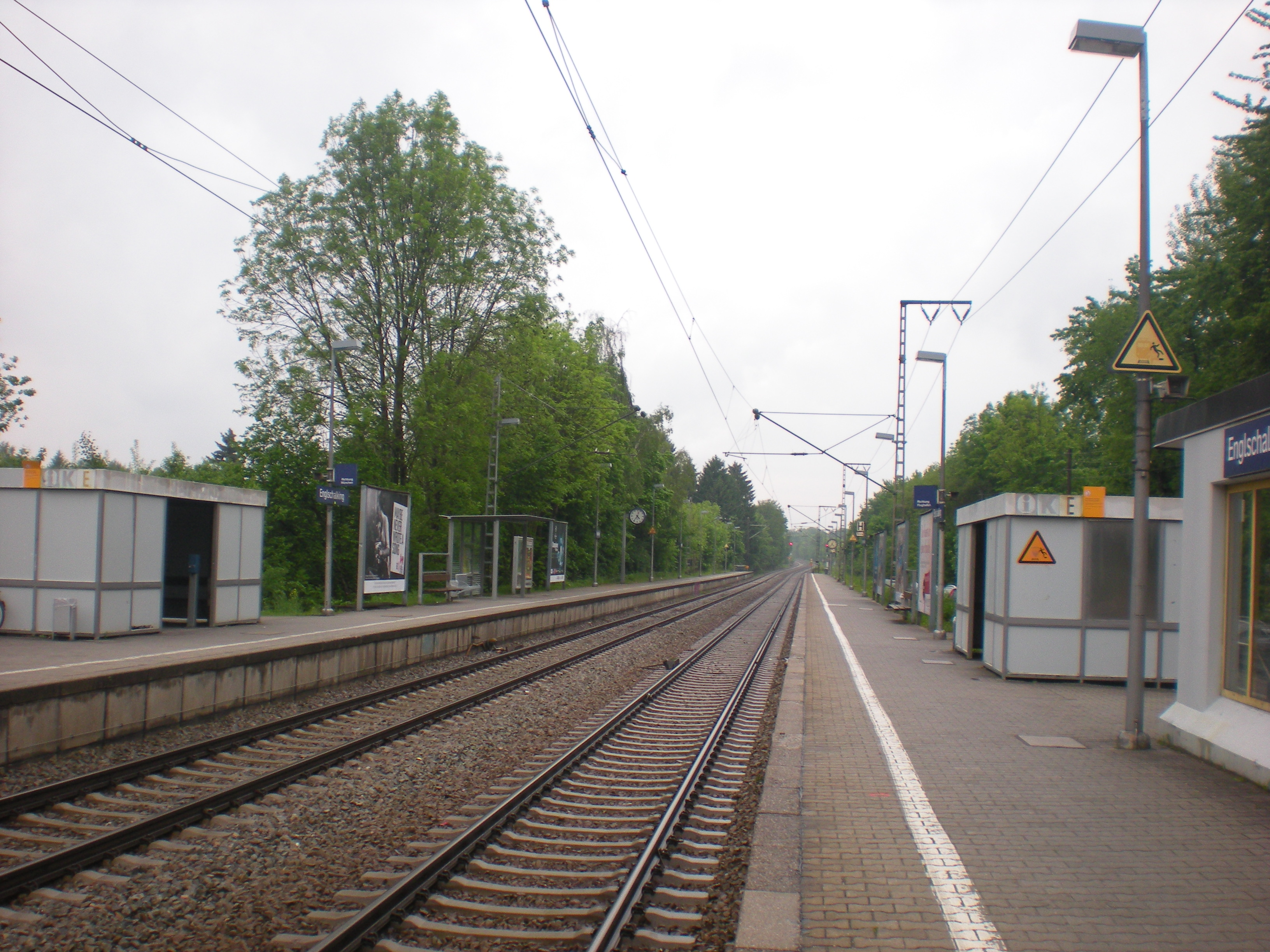
München-Englschalking stop

The railway line from Munich East–Munich Airport runs through Englschalking and every 20 minutes the S8 line of the Munich S-Bahn from Herrsching to Munich Airport travels there. The double-track S-Bahn station München-Englschalking, equipped with side-rail platforms, is located here.

The tram line to Saint Emmeram which opened in 2011, touches Englschalking along Cosimastraße. Currently, line 16 runs on it with connections to Bogenhausen (Arabellapark, Effnerplatz, Herkomerplatz, Ismaninger Straße), to Haidhausen (Klinikum rechts der Isar, Max-Weber-Platz, Wiener Platz, Gasteig, Müllersches Volksbad) and to the city centre.

The underground line U4 from the city centre does not quite reach Englschalking, but is well connected with three bus lines and one tram line to the Arabellapark terminal.

There are plans to extend the underground line 4 from the current end terminal Arabellapark via Fidelio Park to the Englschalking S-Bahn station. The journey time between Bogenhausen and the Munich Airport would be shortened by a few minutes. However, critics are sceptical about extending the rather underutilized U4. Some of the calculated passenger growth has already been absorbed by the new tram line, so that the extension of the subway is currently postponed.
