= Denning (Munich) =

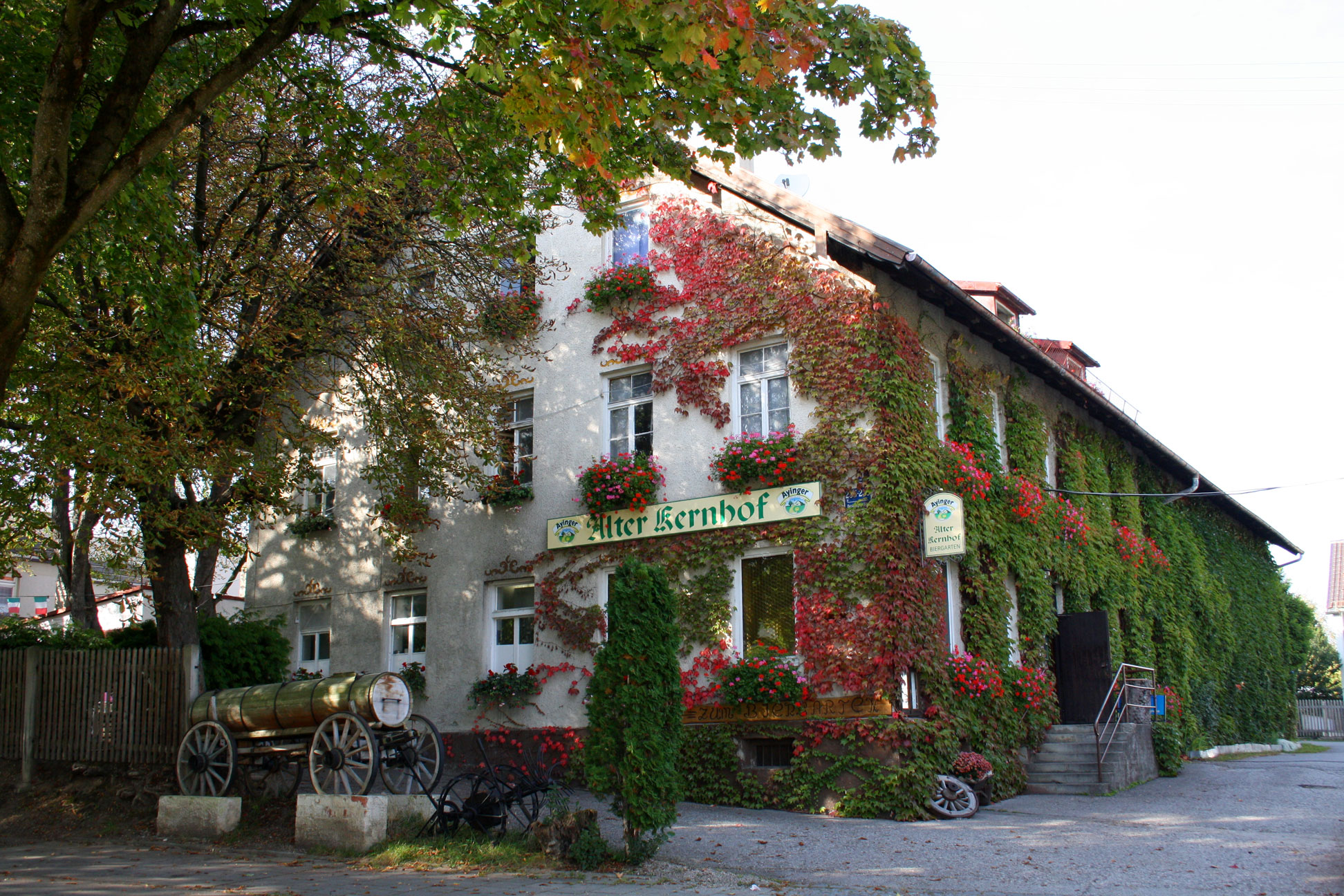
Alter Kernhof in the center of Denning

Denning is a quarter of the Bavarian capital Munich that belongs to district 13 Bogenhausen.

== Geography ==
Denning is located in the eastern part of Bogenhausen urban district between Englschalking in the north and Zamdorf in the south. The historic city center is located at the intersection between the east-west axis formed by Denninger and Daglfinger Straße and the north-south axis formed by Friedrich-Eckart-Straße and Ostpreußenstraße. The borders of Denning are the Vollmannstraße in the west, the Memeler Straße in the north, the S-Bahn line in the east and the Denninger Anger in the south.

== History ==
The Denning area was settled during the Roman period around the end of the first to the middle of the third century CE. A relic of the Roman past of Denning is a villa rustica with its own bathhouse. It was excavated in 1928.

In official documents, Denning was first mentioned in 1200 as Tenningen or Danningen, which probably refers to the personal name Tenno.

Around 1800, Denning was a hamlet with four farms, of which only the Alte Kernhof is preserved, along with the Guardian Angel Chapel. One of the courtyards and the Guardian Angel Chapel were demolished in the 1950s. The other two courtyards were demolished around the end of the 1970s, due to the relocation of the Daglfinger Straße.

When the village was incorporated into Bavaria in 1818, Denning initially formed the independent municipality Zamdorf with Zamdorf and Steinhausen, which was incorporated in 1820 into the community Daglfing. An application by Denning to be converted to Bogenhausen was rejected in 1873 by the presiding authorities.

The Obermaier Kiesquetschwerks was mined in the 19th century for brick production for Munich's growing construction industry. For example, the Ludwigskirche was built with bricks burned in Denning. After the clay was exhausted, the pits were used for gravel extraction.

At the end of the 19th century, eight properties were in Denning. Settlement activity began in 1924. East of today's Ostpreußenstraße to today's Platz Zur Deutschen Einheit ('place for German unity') was the Obermaiersche colony, named after the lead contractor. From 1926, the Denning colony arose west of today's Ostpreußenstraße. The number of houses increased to 140 by 1930 when Daglfing was incorporated on 1 January into Munich.

At the end of the 1960s, the Denninger Straße-Warthestraße was built up with four to eight-story residential developments south of the Denninger Straße, which were also called Denninger Hochhäuser (Denninger skyscrapers) due to the otherwise lower development of Denning.

Following the quarry's closure, the unused gravel plant stood on Denninger Straße until approximately 2000, more precisely on the Pühnstraße. In a dilapidated state, it was demolished and converted to recreation and nature.

== Geology and land use ==
An almost two-meter-thick layer of clay lies beneath a thin layer of humus.

== Neighborhoods ==
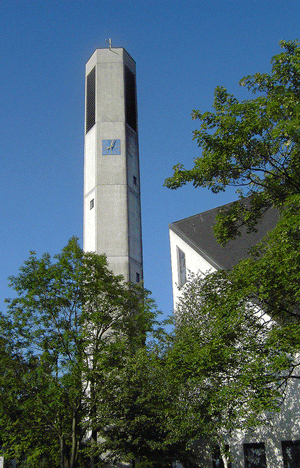
Tower of the Immanuel Church

Denning is characterized by residential areas with single-family homes surrounded by gardens. Skyscrapers are found in the settlement Denninger Straße-Warthestraße at the southern end of Denning. The oldest remaining property in Denning is the restaurant Alter Kernhof on the corner of Ostpreußen-Denninger Straße.

The main thoroughfare in Denning is the Ostpreußenstraße, which holds more than 100 shops and service companies. Restaurants and a pub are there.

In the core area of Denning are found small parks such as that at Posener Platz or at the Platz Zur Deutschen Einheit. Therefore, the Denninger Anger extends along the entire southern border of Denning. In the west, a green band runs in the north-south direction. In the Denninger Anger, at the Denninger Straße 190, the gravel plant's administrative building is the last reminder.

== Religion ==
Since the demolition of the Guardian Angel Chapel in 1953, no Roman Catholic church building is in Denning. However, the Catholic parish church of St. Emmeram in the neighboring Englschalking district is located on the Ostpreußenstraße a few meters from the border between the two districts. Near the same border on the Denninger side, is the Protestant-Lutheran Immanuel Church on the Memeler Straße.
