= Dunning House =

Historic house in New York, United States

- U.S. National Register of Historic Places
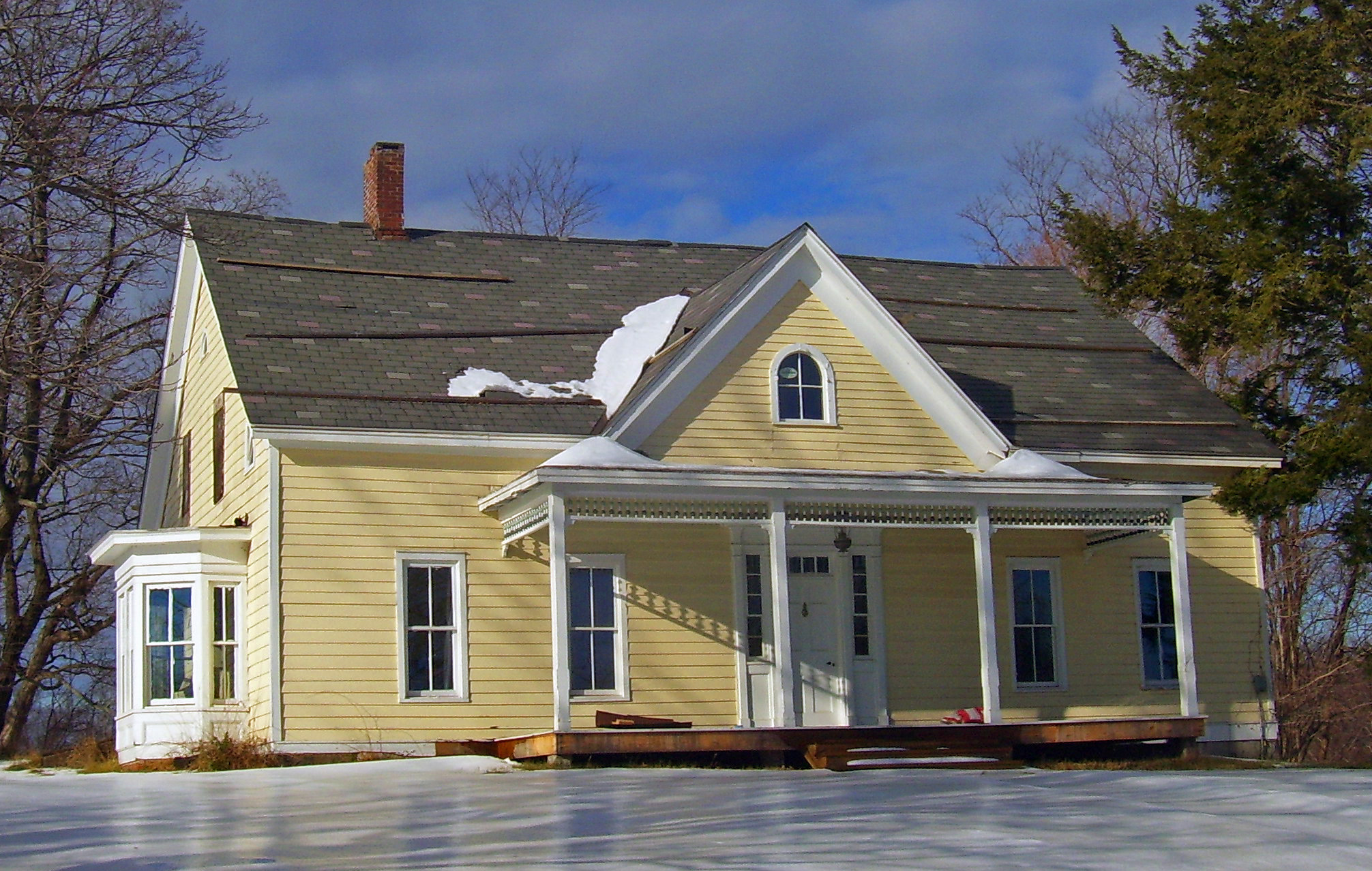
- House in 2007, with Victorian oriel window and porch visible.
- Location: Wawayanda, NY
- Nearest city: Middletown
- Coordinates: 41°22′30″N 74°28′11″W
- Area: 1.1 acre (4,400 m²)
- Built: 18th-19th century
- Architectural style: Federal, Italianate
- NRHP reference No.: 01001383
- Added to NRHP: 2001

The Dunning House is located on Ridgebury Road in the Town of Wawayanda, New York, United States. It is a wooden house first built in the mid-18th century and extensively renovated several times in the 19th. As a result, it embodies a number of different architectural styles.

A modest two-room clapboard house first built around 1750, a then-common design with a few extant examples in the region, it was later expanded in the early 19th century in a Federal style center-hall plan. The hallway still features a segmented Federal archway with its keystone supported by a pair of reeded pilasters. The hand-hewn beams, doors, trim and wall finishes are also original to that period and style.

Later renovations added interior rooms with Greek Revival features such as architraves, moldings, cornices and medallions. In the Victorian era, a Stick style porch with chamfered posts and an intricate cornice molding was built on the front and an oriel window on the southwest side. Late in the 19th century, a central front gable was added with an arch top window.

The renovations and additions over the course of the 19th century have produced a modern house of two and a half stories with five bays. It is located on a 1.1-acre (4,400 m^{2}) parcel, overlooking the Slate Hill area, with one other building, a modern greenhouse not considered a contributing property. In 2001, it was added to the National Register of Historic Places due to its relatively intact preservation of its stylistically different architectural features. It is currently up for sale, with an asking price of $800,000.
