= Sedlmayr =

Sedlmayr is a surname. Notable people with the surname are:

- Carl J. Sedlmayr (1886–1965), American founder and owner of Royal American Shows
- Hans Sedlmayr (1896–1984), Austrian art historian
- Helene Sedlmayr (1813–1898) German beauty
- Walter Sedlmayr (1926–1990) German actor from Bavaria
- Max Sedlmeyer, German mountaineer and climber
