= Margaret B. Denning =

American missionary and temperance worker

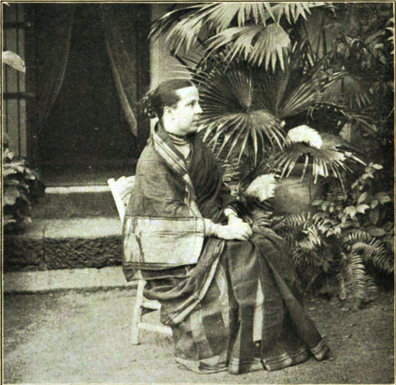
- Born: Margaret Weaver Boehme (or Beahm); October 17, 1856; Harrisburg, Pennsylvania, U.S.
- Died: August 16, 1935 (aged 78); Pacific Palisades, California, U.S.
- Occupations: missionary; temperance activist; writer
- Notable work: Mosaics from India
- Spouse: John Otis Denning (m. 1886)
- Children: 3

Margaret B. Denning (October 17, 1856 – August 16, 1935) was an American missionary and temperance worker who spent 29 years in India. She was also the author two books, Mosaics from India (1902) and Dainty cookery for the home (1903).

== Early life and education ==
Margaret Weaver Boehme (or Beahm) was born at Harrisburg, Pennsylvania, October 17, 1856.

The family moved to Canton, Illinois and she was graduated from its high school. Afterwards, she attended Illinois Wesleyan University (Ph. B., 1882).

== Career ==
Denning taught school until 1886.

She married Dr. John Otis Denning, M. A., on May 4, 1886. The couple were affiliated with the Presbyterian Mission Agency. They received an appointment for missionary workin India by the Board of Foreign Missions of the Methodist Episcopal Church and arrived in Bombay, December 1890; they served in India for 39 years. She was stationed at Gonda, United Provinces, where she became active in temperance work in connection with her mission enterprises.

In 1911, Denning was elected president of the National Woman's Christian Temperance Union (W.C.T.U.) of India, and she retained that office until 1919. For some years preceding her election as president, she had been corresponding secretary of the Union, which at that time had a membership of about 4,000. She was also connected with the Independent Order of Good Templars, holding various positions in that body.

After attending the World W.C.T.U. conference in London (1920), she stayed on for a few months to continue her temperance work in England. Over the next three years, she remained with the World W.C.T.U. in charge of correspondence with secretaries in 42 other countries.

Besides delivering frequent addresses, Denning wrote a number of temperance pamphlets, as well as a book entitled Mosaics from India.

== Personal life ==
Denning was a member of the Daughters of the American Revolution.

The Dennings had three sons, one of whom died at birth and two who died in 1905.

Margaret B. Denning died in Pacific Palisades, California, August 16, 1935.

== Selected works ==
- Mosaics from India: Talks about India, Its Peoples, Religions and Customs, by Margaret Boehme Denning (Fleming H. Revell Company, 1902)
- Dainty cookery for the home: containing English, American and Indian dishes (1903)
