= Scott Denning =

A. Scott Denning
- Education: University of Maine, Colorado State University
- Children: 2
- Awards: Monfort Professor Award from Colorado State University, 2002
- Scientific career
- Fields: Atmospheric science
- Workplaces: University of California at Santa Barbara, Colorado State University, Yale University
- Thesis: A study of the transport, sources, and sinks of atmospheric CO₂ using a general circulation model (1994)
- Website: www.atmos.colostate.edu/faculty/denning.php

A. Scott Denning is a climate scientist and professor of atmospheric science at Colorado State University, whose faculty he joined in 1998. He is known for his research into atmosphere-biosphere interactions, the global carbon cycle, and atmospheric carbon dioxide. He firmly supports action to avoid climate change. He has also argued that, if no action is taken on the matter, global warming could make the climate of Colorado resemble that of southern New Mexico, Texas and Mexico.

== Education and scientific career ==
Denning received his BA in geology from the University of Maine and his MS and PhD in atmospheric science from Colorado State University in 1993 and 1994, respectively. He then spent two years as an assistant professor in the Donald Bren School of Environmental Science and Management at the University of California at Santa Barbara. He joined the faculty of Colorado State University in 1998, and become the director of education for the Center for Multi-Scale Modeling of Atmospheric Processes in 2006. Denning also worked on the Orbiting Carbon Observatory's scientific team. As of 2026, Denning has works as a visiting professor at the Yale School of the Environment most fall semesters.

== Debates ==
Denning has appeared twice at the Heartland Institute's International Conference on Climate Change. In 2011, Denning debated skeptical climatologist Roy Spencer at the 6th International Conference on Climate Change.
