= Dening =

Dening is a surname. Notable people with the surname include:

- Wesley Dening (born 1983), Australian television host and comedian
- Mitch Dening (born 1988), Australian baseball player
- Greg Dening (1931–2008), Australian historian
- John Pitt Dening (1894–1929), British polo champion
- Fernando Emanuel Dening (born 1988), Argentine footballer
