= Ismaninger Straße =

Street in Munich, Germany

Coordinates: 48.135666°N 11.597891°E

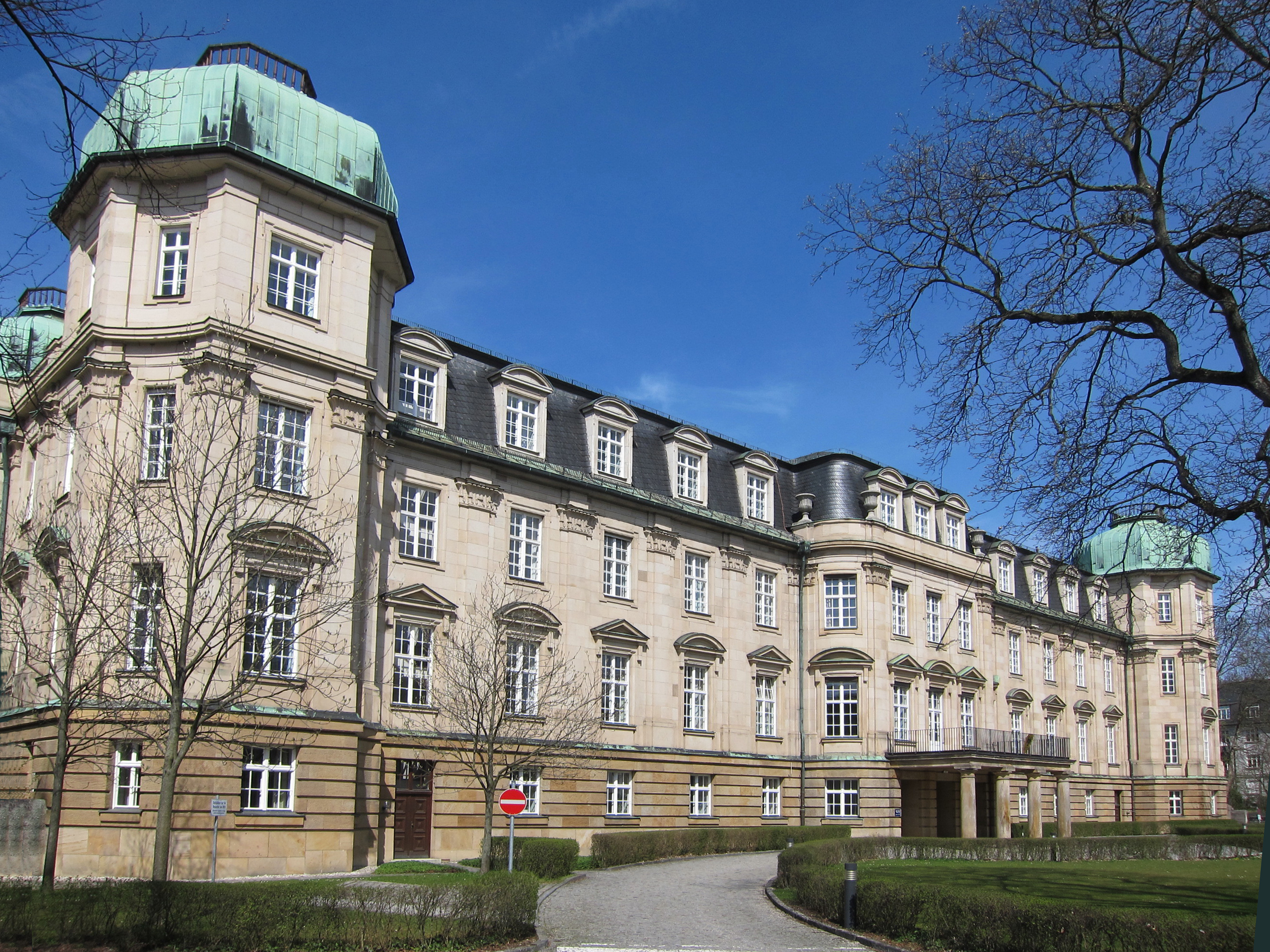
The Federal Fiscal Court on Ismaninger Straße

The Ismaninger Straße is a city center, entrance and exit road in Munich.

== Route ==
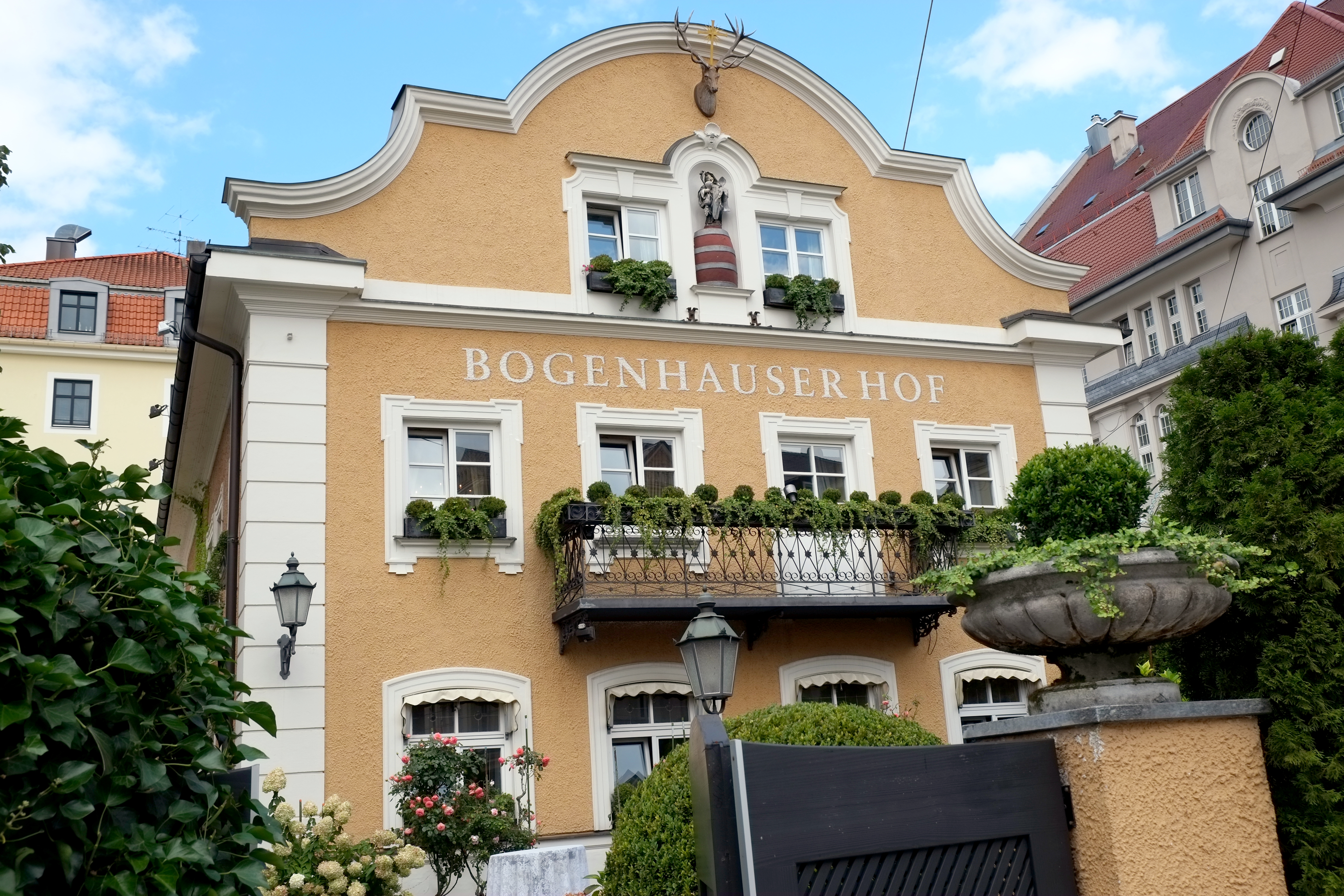
"Bogenhauser Hof"

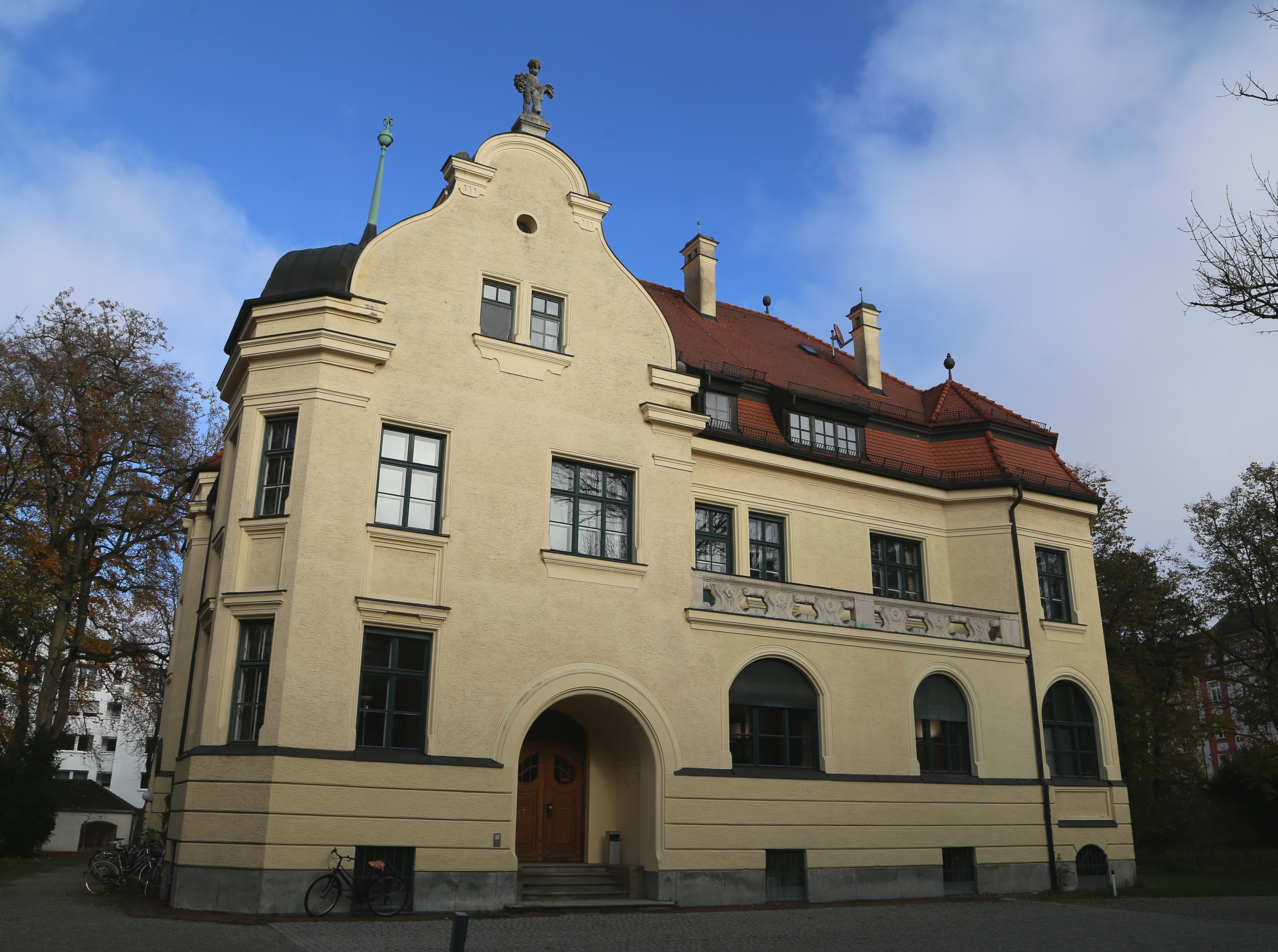
Mayor's Villa (No. 95)

The road continues straight to the north along the Innere Wiener Straße at the Max-Weber-Platz in Haidhausen, crosses the Prinzregentenstraße at the city district border between the districts of Au-Haidhausen and Bogenhausen, and continues east on the eastern Isarhochufer of the old town of Bogenhausen at the traditional restaurant Bogenhauser Hof (No. 85) and further on the former noble seat Steppberg (later Villa Fleischer, completed after the First World War as Reichsfinanzhof, (now Bundesfinanzhof) over to the Herkomerplatz fort, where it comes from the Isar bridge Max-Joseph-Brücke to meet Montgelasstraße, which is extended from Bülowstraße to Effnerplatz. The extension of the Ismaninger Straße forms the Oberföhringer Straße, which continues on the high bank through the Bogenhausen district Oberföhring, the community Unterföhring and further in the direction of Ismaning.

The tram line 17 runs through the street (until the timetable change of Line 16 in December 2017). At Max-Weber-Platz it crosses several other tram lines. Under the Max-Weber-Platz is the same named metro station with branches of the U4 and U5 subway lines.

== Designation ==
The street is named after the municipality of Ismaning, the capital of the same named county, which did not belong to Bavaria until 1802, but to the Hochstift Freising. The name of the street dates back to 1856.

== Historical architectural monuments in Ismaninger Straße ==
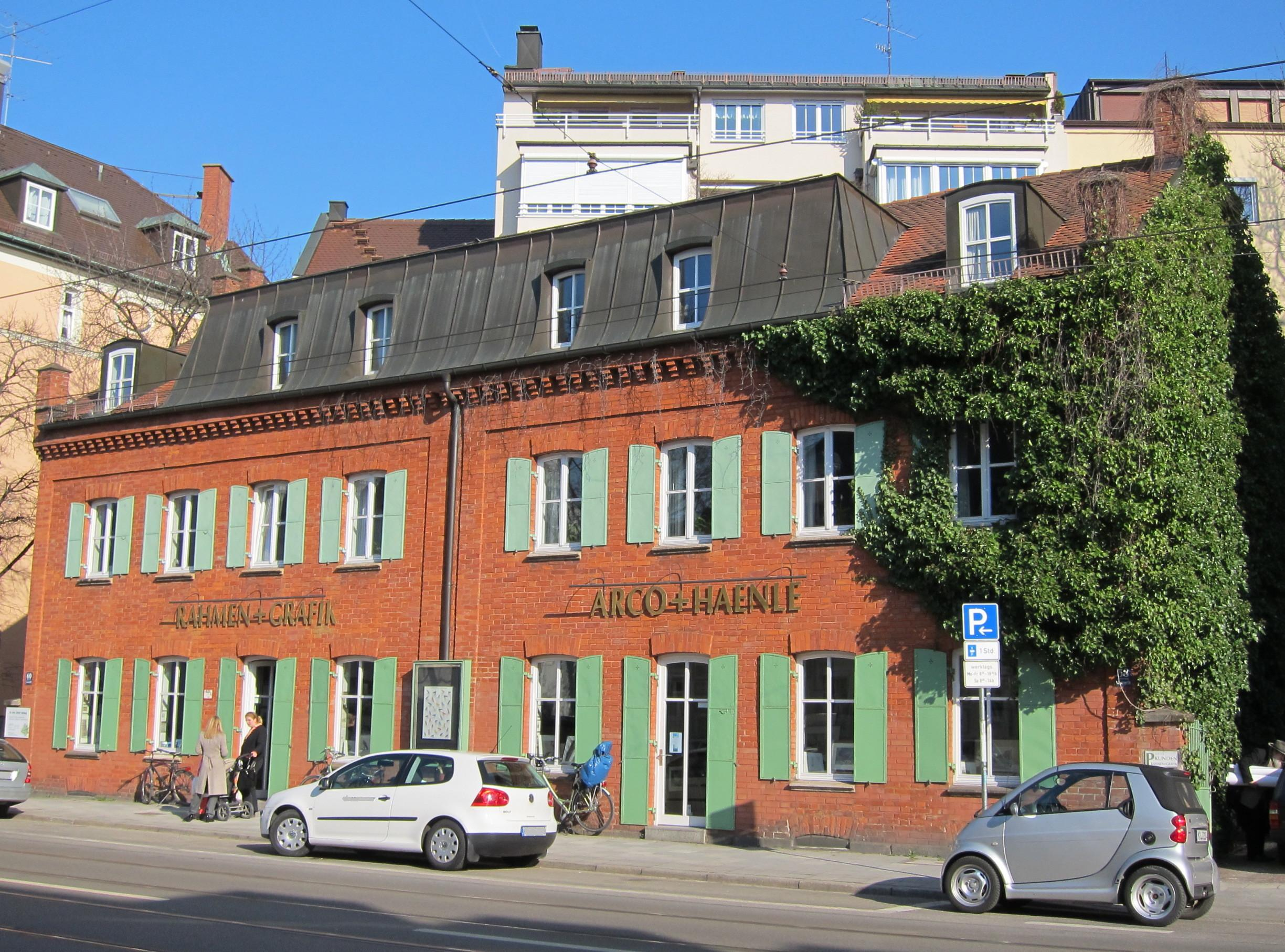
House No. 58 and 60

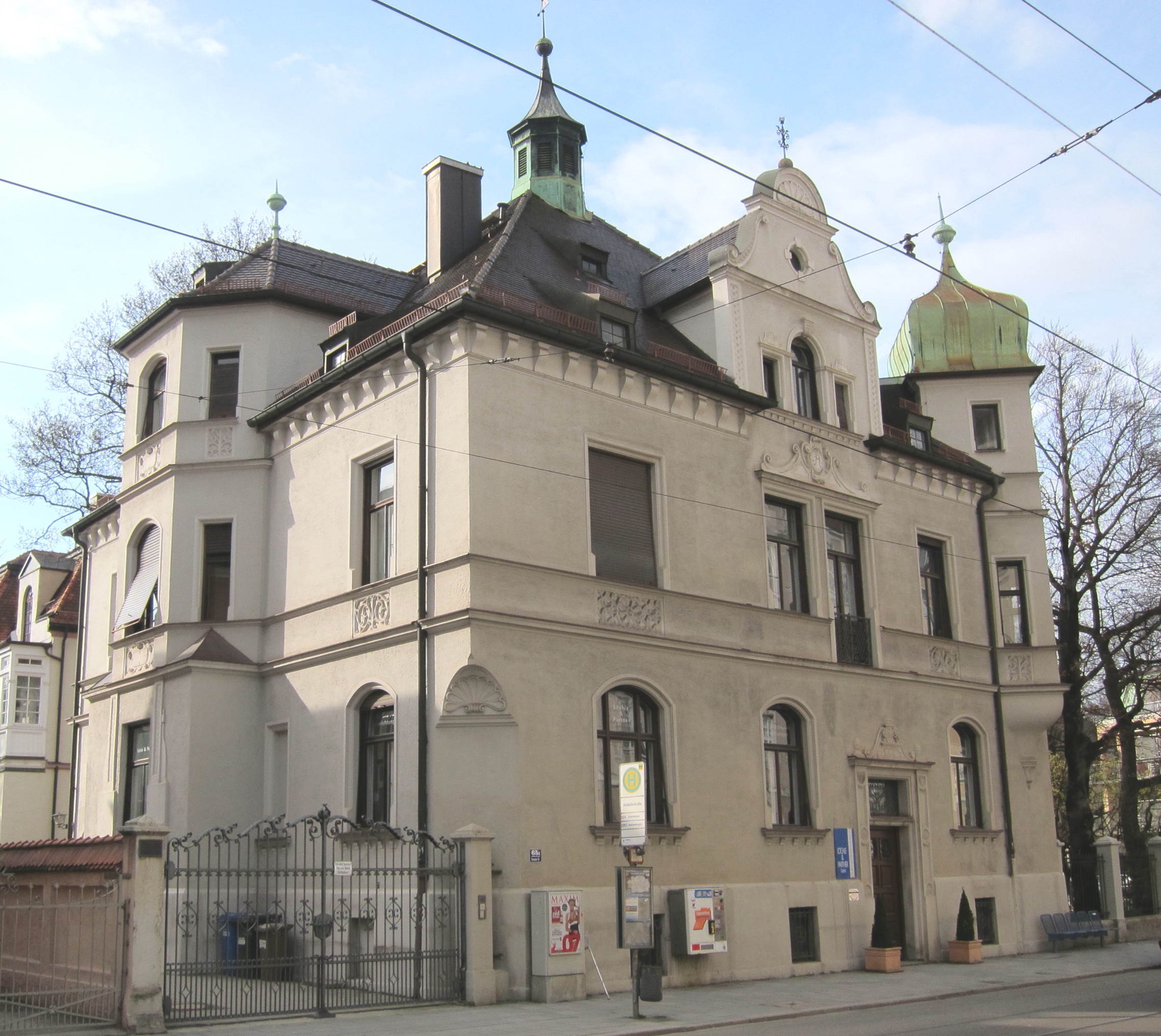
House No. 65a

- No. 1 Tenement house, late 19th C.
- No. 2, 4 semi-detached house, Art Nouveau, around 1900, with bay window
- No. 3 Tenement house, Neo-Renaissance, with bay Window, Late 19th C.
- No. 5 Suburban house, Late Classicist Corner construction, Mid-19th C.
- No. 11 Tenement house, around 1860/70
- No. 22 administrative wing of the hospital, 1892/93 by Wilhelm Rettig
- No. 27 Neo-Baroque Villa, 1899, redesigned in 1954
- No. 29 Richard Strauss Conservatory, late 19th century, redesigned
- No. 50 Tenement house, Neo-Baroque, 1899
- No. 52 Tenement house, 1892 by Korbinian Schmid, group with Prinzregentenstraße 67
- No. 56 Tenement house, Late Classicist, around 1870
- No. 58/60 block of two small raw brick houses, 1881
- No. 62a Tenement, Neo-Baroque, around 1900, group with Geibelstraße 1
- No. 65 villa-like Neo-Baroque construction with high Belvedere, 1903
- No. 65a villa-style corner house in German Renaissance style, 1896 by Alfons Hering as a separate residential building
- No. 67a Villa, Neo-Baroque, 1903, by Josef Wölker
- No. 68 Tenement house with entrance tower, 1899
- No. 69 Villa-like Baroque construction, early 20th C.
- No. 74 Tenement, Neo-Baroque, early 20th century
- No. 75 Tenement house, German Renaissance style, with an entrance tower, around 1900
- No. 82 Tenement house, around 1900
- No. 84 Tenement house, Baroque style Art Nouveau, around 1900
- No. 85 Gaststätte Bogenhauser Hof, Detached suburban house, Late Classicist, with richly curved south gable, around 1850
- No. 86 Tenement house, Art Nouveau, around 1900
- No. 88 Tenement house, German Renaissance, around 1900
- No. 91 Tenement house, German Renaissance, around 1900
- No. 92 Tenement house, Neo-Baroque, 1898 by Leonhard Romeis
- No. 94/96 Group of Tenement houses, Baroque Art Nouveau, early 20th C.
- No. 95 castle-like Neo-Baroque villa (so-called Bürgermeistervilla), 1898 by Paul Pfann and Günther Blumentritt
- No. 98 Tenement house, corner construction in Baroque Art Nouveau style, 1910
- No. 102/106 handsome semi-detached house in late Baroque Art Nouveau style, 1910/11 by Oswald Schiller
- No. 105 Togal-Werk, 1899/1900 by Paul Pfann
- No. 109 castle-like, Neo-Baroque monumental building (now Bundesfinanzhof)
- No. 111/113/115 Baroque residential group, 1922/23
- No. 122 Tenement house, Neo-Renaissance, 1889 by Michael Reifenstuel, added on in 1901
- No. 124 Tenement house, German Renaissance, around 1900, with large group of Michaels (renewed)
- No. 126 Tenement house, German Renaissance, 1901 by Benedikt Beggel
- No. 152/154/156/158 Residential group which leads around the corner to the Pixisstraße, 1927 by Heilmann & Littmann for the non-profit Wohnbaugesellschaft München-Ost (housing association)
