= Disorder and Early Sorrow =

Short story by Thomas Mann

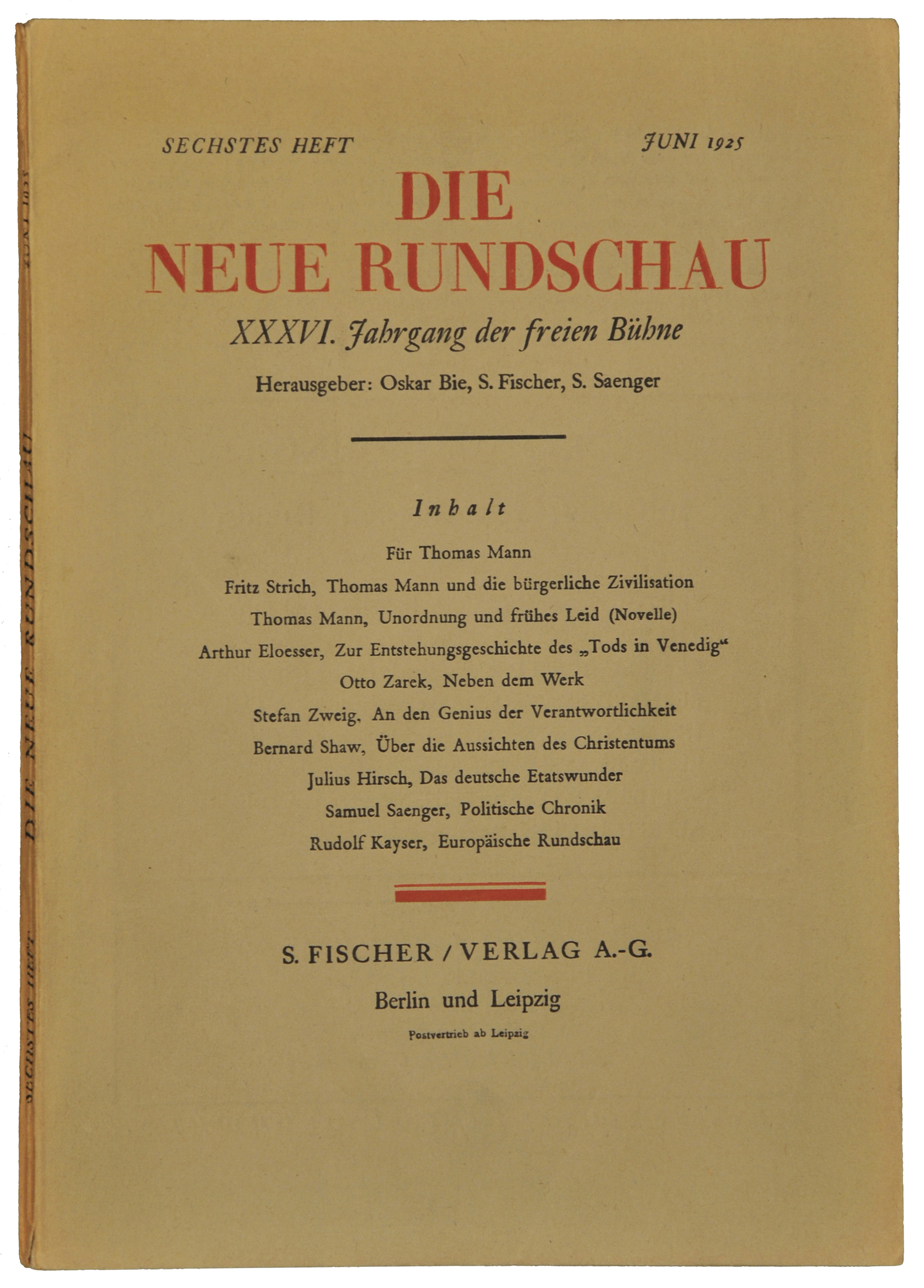
- First published in Die neue Rundschau
- Author: Thomas Mann
- Original title: Unordnung und frühes Leid
- Language: German
- Genre: Novella
- Publisher: S. Fischer Verlag
- Publication date: 1925 (periodical); 1926 (book)
- Publication place: Germany
- Text: Disorder and Early Sorrow at Internet Archive

Disorder and Early Sorrow (German: Unordnung und frühes Leid) is a 1925 novella written by Thomas Mann. It follows the fortunes of the Cornelius family through the perspective of Abel Cornelius (written in a third person narrative voice), a 47-year-old history professor at the local university, whose status in society was once highly respected but has diminished markedly. The Cornelius family is, in part, a reflection of Mann's own family. The novella explores the psychological and social impact of the Weimar hyperinflation. It first appeared in 1925 in a Festschrift celebrating Mann's 50th birthday in the publication Neue Rundschau. It first appeared in English in The Dial in two installments in 1926 (October and November). As an individual book, it was published in an English translation by Helen Tracy Lowe-Porter in 1929 and in one by Herman George Scheffauer in 1930. It was translated in 2023 by Damion Searls as "Chaotic World and Childhood Sorrow".

Damion Searls views it as "Mann's best story—it was Hemingway's favorite, too, for whatever that's worth. I think it belongs up there with James Joyce's 'The Dead' and anything you want to name by Gallant or Munro or Chekov at the very top of the canon of short fiction, but it is never, to my knowledge, singled out as such."

== Plot summary ==
The novella is set in one day in Munich in Weimar Germany. The Cornelius family is preparing a party for Ingrid and Bert, Professor Cornelius's children. The family is divided up on the basis of chronology, foreshadowing a central theme of the work, which is the interplay between different generations at a time of dislocating social and economic change. In Lowe-Porter's translation, Ingrid and Bert, both adolescents, are "the big folk"; Professor Cornelius and his wife are "the old folk"; Ellie and Snapper (Lorrie and Biter in Searls' translation), their youngest children, are "the little folk"; and Professor Cornelius's parents, who are only discussed and who do not feature directly in the story, are "the ancients". In Searls' translation, they are, respectively, "the Bigs," "the Littles," "the Elders," and "the Ancients."

== Film version ==
A West German film adaptation Disorder and Early Torment was released in 1977, directed by Franz Seitz.
