= Brunnthaler Quellbach =

River in Germany

Coordinates: 48°08′53″N 11°36′01″E

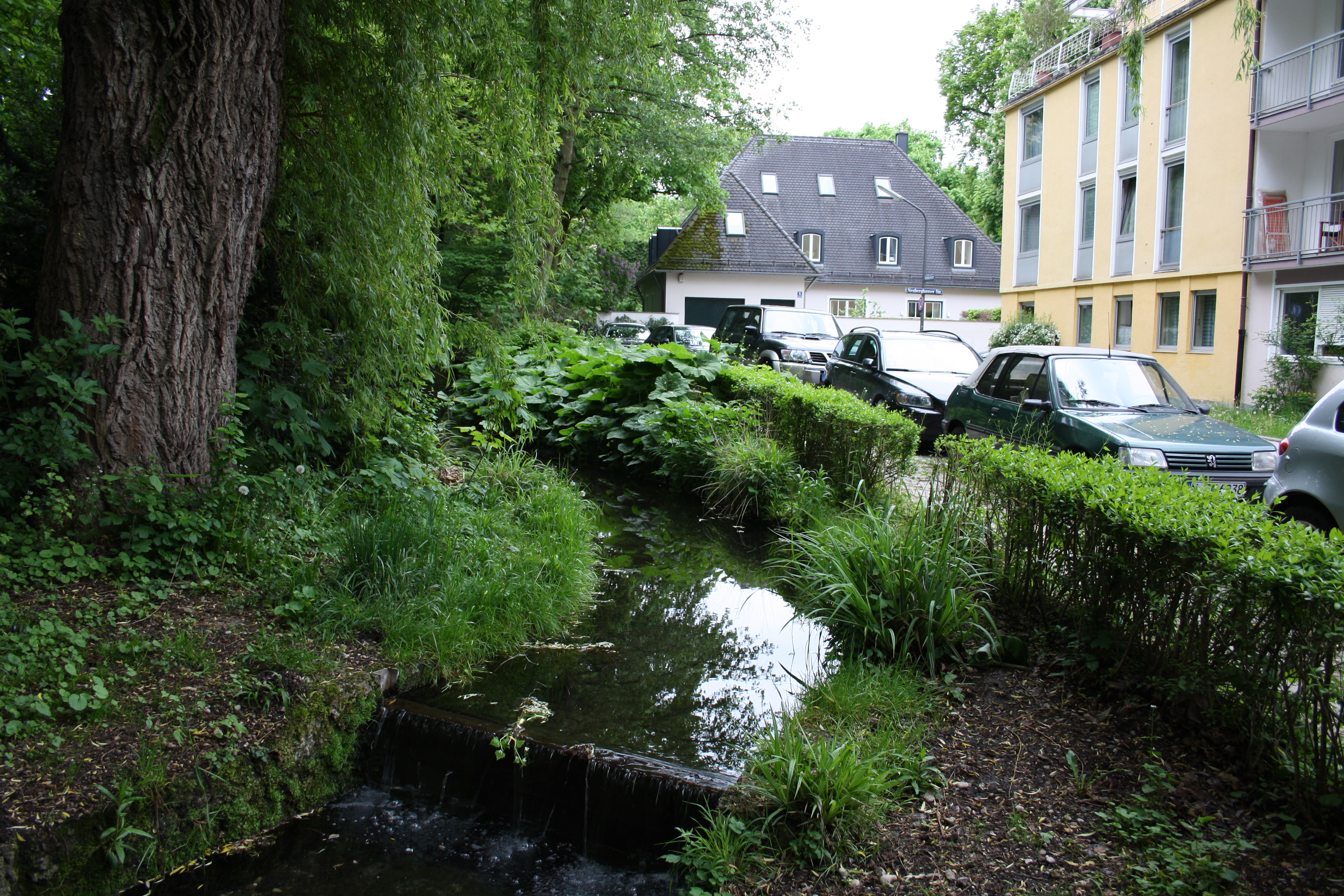
- Brunnthaler Quellbach

Location
- Country: Germany
- State: Bavaria

Physical characteristics
- Mouth
  - location: Isar

Basin features
- Progression: Isar→ Danube→ Black Sea

Brunnthaler Quellbach (also: Quellenbach) is a river of Munich, Bavaria, Germany.

Until the end of the 19th century, the Munich river Brunnbach had its source near Bad Brunnthal in the lower Bogenhausen district and, as today, was a tributary of the Isar at St. Emmeran. At the time the Herzogpark was covered with buildings the Brunnbach was filled up north of the street Montgelaßstraße. The former upper course of the Brunnbach in the Maximiliansanlagen park is now a river of its own and is called Brunnthaler Quellbach or Quellenbach.

The Brunnthaler Quellbach flows along the street Steinbacherstraße into the small pond Steinbacher Teich, from there a subterranean drainage south of the bridge Max-Joseph-Brücke into the Isar exists.

== See also ==
- List of rivers of Bavaria
