= A Man and His Dog (narrative) =

1918 narrative by Thomas Mann

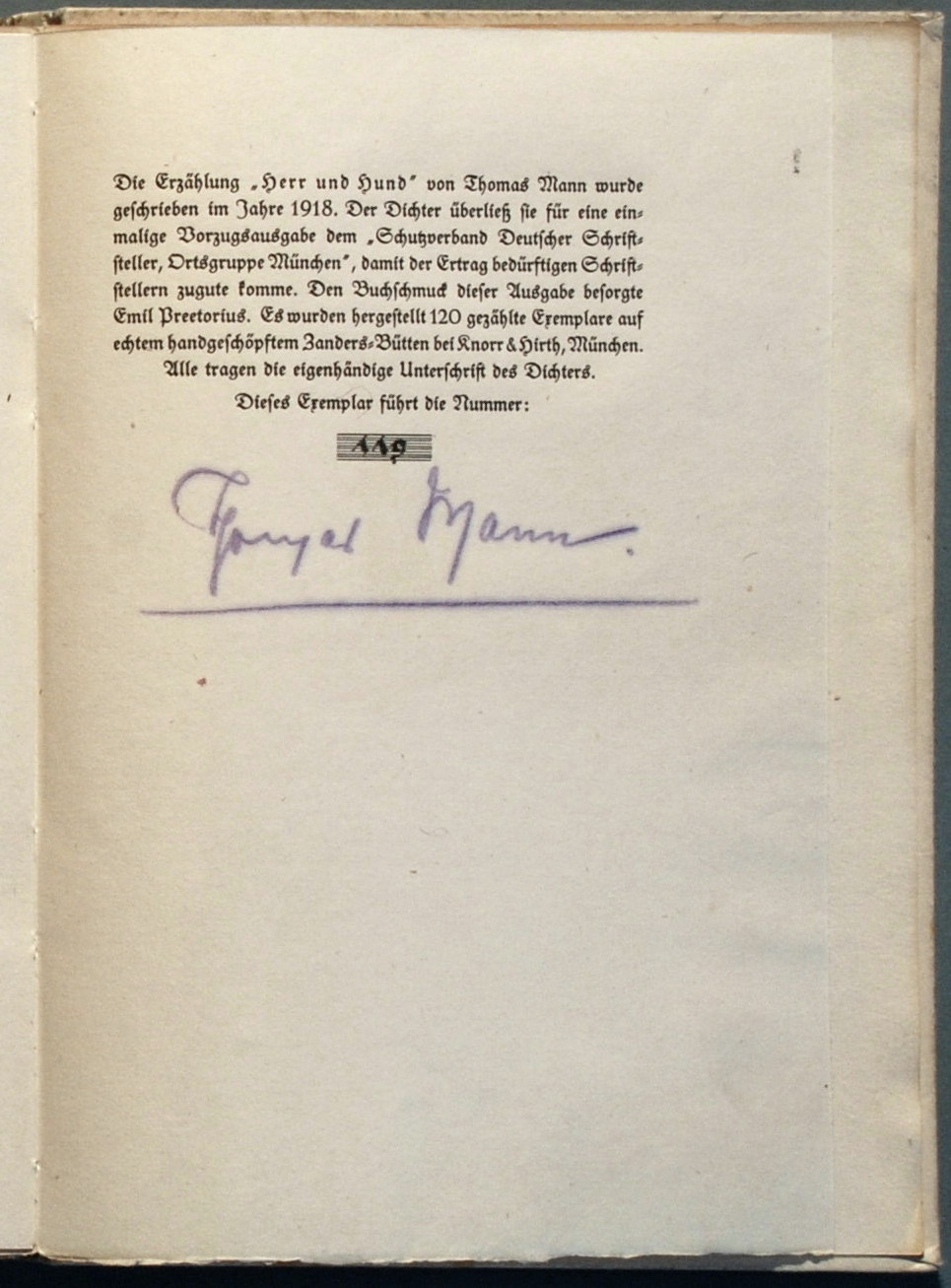
- Copy 119 of the special edition, published in November 1919
- Author: Thomas Mann
- Original title: German: Herr und Hund
- Translators: Helen Tracy Lowe-Porter; Herman George Scheffauer
- Language: German
- Genre: Idyll
- Publication place: Germany
- Text: A Man and His Dog at Internet Archive

A Man and His Dog (German: Herr und Hund; also translated Bashan and I) is a 1918 narrative by Thomas Mann. It describes the adventures of the narrator with his dog Bauschan (Bashan) in the nature surrounding the author's home in Munich. It was written in the twilight of World War I and portrays an idealised and timeless world.

== Writing and publication history ==
=== Writing and background ===
Thomas Mann began writing A Man and His Dog on 18 March 1918 – immediately after he had completed his Reflections of a Nonpolitical Man and shortly before his sixth child Michael was born on 21 April 1918. He finished his work on the narrative on 14 October 1918. The short work – with the German subtitle An Idyll – was thus written in the final months of World War I. In his diary entry for 27 October 1918, Thomas Mann explained his reasons for writing the narrative in relation to the war:

Es [Gesang vom Kinde] ist, wie auch Herr und Hund, dem es sich anschließt, eine seelische, idyllisch-menschlische Reaktion auf die Zeit, ein Ausdruck einer durch Leiden und Erschütterungen erzeugten weichen Stimmung, des Bedürfnisses nach Liebe, Zärtlichkeit, Güte, auch nach Ruhe und Sinnigkeit [...].

It [Song of the Newborn], like A Man and His Dog, which it joins, is a spiritual, idyllic-human reaction to its time, an expression of a soft mood generated by suffering and upheavals, of the need for love, tenderness, kindness, also for peace and sensuality.

— Thomas Mann [Diary entry for 27 October 1918]

=== Publication and translations ===
In Germany, the narrative was first published individually by the Knorr & Hirth-Verlag in Munich in the fall of 1919 as a special edition of 120 numbered and signed copies. The printing was illustrated by Emil Preetorius. The proceeds of this luxurious printing went to writers in need. It contained an introduction by Thomas Mann where he explained – with a hint of irony – that he only intended to write about the real life of his dog Bauschan and did not want to deal with societal or "higher" issues. He explained:

Im Folgenden ist ausschließlich von meinem Hunde Bauschan die Rede, wovon reellerweise im voraus jedermann ausdrücklich verständigt sei, damit niemand später getäuschte Erwartungen einklagen könne, sondern jeder, den die Beschäftigung mit einem so nebensächlichen Gegenstand unter seiner geistigen Würde dünkt, diese Blätter […] sogleich beiseite werfe […]. Denn weder werden höhere Probleme der Sittlichkeit darin aufgeworfen, noch bedeutende Charaktere zergliedert, geschweige denn, daß die gesellschaftliche Frage ihrer Lösung näher geführt würde.

In the following, only my dog Bauschan is being discussed, of which, as a matter of fact, everyone is expressly informed in advance, so that no one can later sue for deceived expectations, but everyone who considers the occupation with such a trivial subject beneath his intellectual dignity should immediately throw these sheets [...] aside [...]. For neither are higher problems of morality raised in them, nor are important characters dissected, let alone is the social question brought closer to its solution.

— Thomas Mann, 1919

At the same time in 1919, the narrative was published along with Gesang vom Kindchen (Song of the Newborn) as Herr und Hund. Gesang vom Kindchen. Zwei Idyllen by S. Fisher.

The first English translation was by Herman George Scheffauer. It was published in London by W. Collins and Sons and Co. under the title Bashan and I in 1923. The US edition was published by Knopf as A Man and His Dog (1930). The narrative was again translated by Helen Tracy Lowe-Porter, also as A Man and His Dog, and published in 1936 by Knopf as a part of Stories of Three Decades.

== Plot ==
In A Man and His Dog Thomas Mann describes his experiences with his chicken-dog (Hühnerhund) mongrel Bauschan (or, in English translations, Bashan) on the banks of the Brunnbach in Munich. In the narrative how the day turns out for the dog is decided in the moment his master leaves his garden. If the master turns left the day is lost for the dog, because he goes to town. But when the master turns right, a walk through nature and the hunting grounds will follow and both march on into a romanticised rural world. The narrative is structured into five chapters:

In the first chapter ("He Comes Round the Corner" ["Er kommt um die Ecke"]) the narrator and the chicken-dog are introduced. In the second chapter ("How We Got Bashan" ["Wie wir Bauschan gewannen"]), it is described how the Manns got Bauschan. In the third chapter ("Notes on Bashan's Character and Manner of Life" ["Einige Nachrichten über Bauschans Lebensweise und Charakter"]) the dog's fixation on his master (Thomas Mann) and its behaviour towards fellow dogs is dealt with. In the penultimate chapter a meticulous description of Mann's walking area around his Munich domicile in Bogenhausen is presented. The fifth and final chapter ("The Hunting-Ground" ["Das Revier"]) is the longest one: In it a visit to a veterinary clinic and various hunts are described.

== Reception and interpretation ==
The narrative was generally well received. Many – including Konrad Lorenz – remarked upon the excellent analysis of a dog's soul and praised the description of the animal's character. In an academic paper, his son Michael interpreted the narrative allegorically: One could turn left and engage with civilisation or go right into idyllic timelessness. Furthermore, Michael Mann saw elements of parody in it when the idealised nature "on the right" was described in a re-markedly ugly fashion. For Michael Mann this marked a turning point in his father, who still yearned for romantic nature but began to see its dark side which would later lead to "romantic barbarism", a stand-in for the upcoming German Nazism.

Nevertheless, Mann's narrative has also received criticism: Frank Braun remarked that "no more than Churchill’s fame rests on his paintings, or Einstein’s on his playing the violin, does Thomas Mann’s literary stature rest on this charming canine idyl." Harshly critical, Peter Handke pointed out that the narrative was written by Thomas Mann in the knowledge that the author was, in fact, Thomas Mann, and that he was a bad writer for it ("Ein schrecklich schlechter Schriftsteller ist das.").

== Bauschan ==
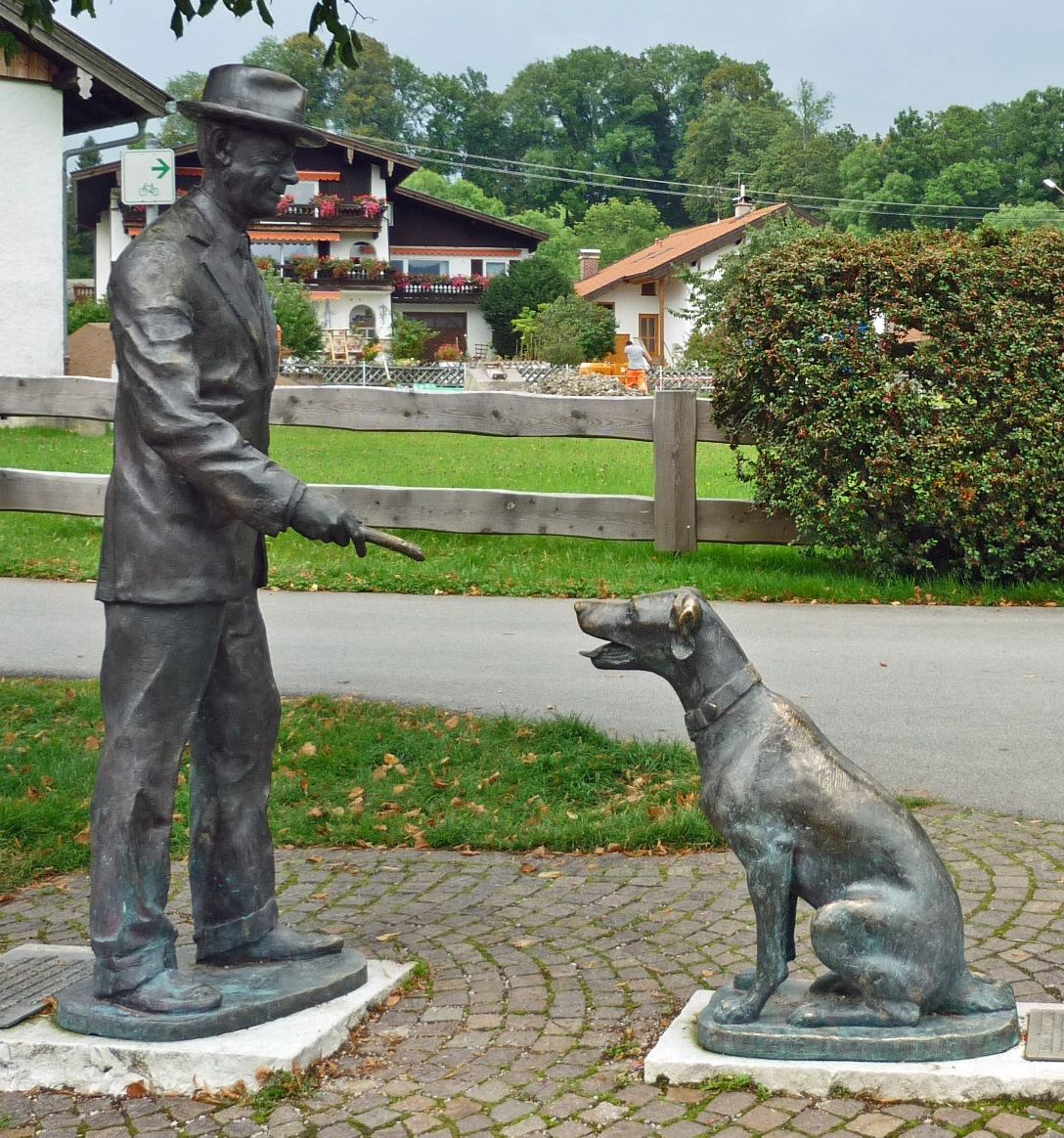
Thomas Mann with Bauschan. Sculpture in Gmund am Tegernsee (Bavaria, Germany)

The fictional dog Bauschan (or in English: Bashan), whose deeds are being told in this narrative, really existed as a dog of the Mann family. This can clearly be seen in the diaries of Thomas Mann and is also confirmed in a 1922 letter called "An Jack [To Jack]", where Thomas Mann affirmed that the fictional and the real Bauschan were identical. This letter has been translated into English.

The name of the fictional and real Bauschan is taken from Fritz Reuter's novel From My Farming Days (Low German: Ut mine Stromtid) and is probably a corruption of Bastian. Bauschan is one of two dogs owned by Mann that became protagonists in his works; the other was his collie Motz (1905–1915), the model for the fictional dog Perceval (Percy) in Royal Highness.

Bauschan lived from the summer of 1916 with the Manns in their Munich villa, which together with its surroundings forms the background of the narrative. The Manns got the dog by an arrangement with the proprietress (Anastasia Halder) of the Café Kogler in Bad Tölz. The dog is said to have had a particularly patriarchal instinct, was naive, resilient and in touch with nature, like idealised common folk.

In the winter of 1919/1920, signs of illness in Bauschan became apparent. Thomas Mann noted in his diary entry for Christmas Day 1919:

Junger Mann mit Schmissen und Dr.-Titel. Diagnose: Staupe in der jetzt grassierenden schweren Form, wovon auch ältere Hunde betroffen. [...] Prognose trübe. [...] Werde mich an den Gedanken gewöhnen müssen, das gute Tier einzubüßen. Fütterte ihn in der Heizung, wo er zu liegen pflegt, mit Wurst.

Young man with Schmissen and Dr. title. Diagnosis: distemper in the now rampant severe form, which also affects older dogs. [...] Prognosis bleak. [...] Will have to get used to the idea of losing the good animal. Fed him sausage in the heater where he tends to lie.

— Thomas Mann [Diary entry for 25 December 1919]

On 26 December 1919, Bauschan was taken to a veterinary clinic by the author's children Erika and Klaus Mann. But to no avail: On 16 January 1920, Bauschan was euthanized and Thomas Mann picked a verse by August von Platen-Hallermünde as his epitaph.

Aus der Klinik Meldung, endgültig, dass Bauschan nicht wiederherzustellen sei. Auch Harnvergiftung ist vorhanden. Schmerzlose Tötung wird empfohlen und von uns denn auch angeordnet. R. I. P. Ich citiere gegen K. als Grabschrift:

"Zwar hat auch ihm das Glück sich hold erwiesen,
Denn schöner stirbt ein Solcher, den im Leben
Ein unvergänglicher Gesang gepriesen."

Message from the clinic, definitive, that Bauschan not to be restored. Urine poisoning is also present. Painless killing is recommended and ordered by us. R. I. P. I quote against K. as an epitaph:

"Luck has also been kind to him,
For such a one dies more beautifully
To whom an everlasting song praised in life."

— Thomas Mann [Diary entry for 16 January 1920]

== Adaptation ==
=== Film ===
- 1963: Herr und Hund: Germany 1963. Director: Caspar van den Berg

=== Audio book ===
- c. 1985: Herr und Hund narrated by Will Quadflieg
