= Brunnbach (Isar) =

River in Germany

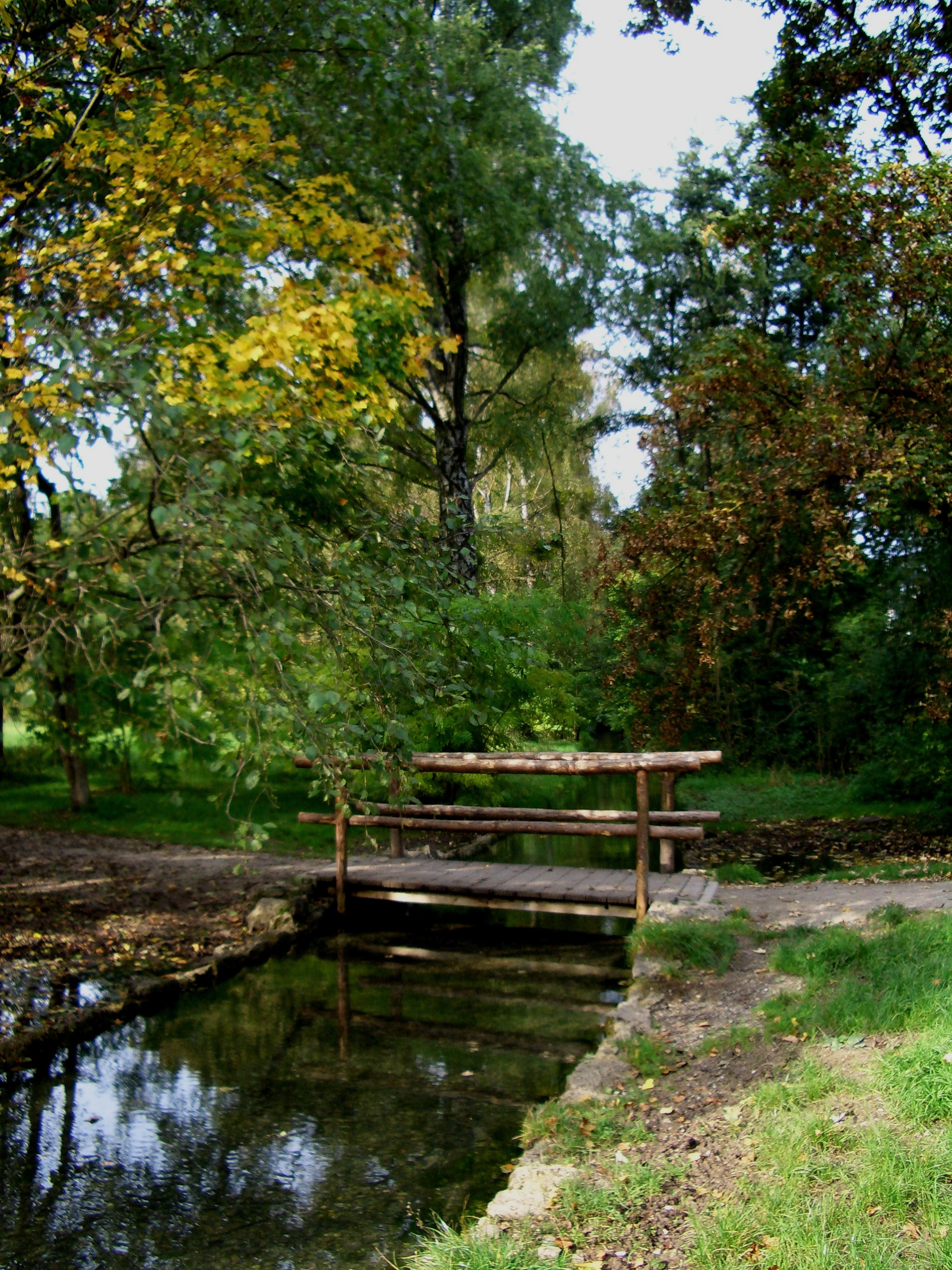
- The Brunnbach in Oberföhring

Location
- Country: Germany
- State: Bavaria

Physical characteristics
- Source
  - location: Herzogpark
- Mouth
  - location: Isar at the bridge St. Emmeram
  - coordinates: 48.1792°N 11.6261°E
- Length: about 3 kilometres (1.9 mi)

Basin features
- Progression: Isar→ Danube→ Black Sea

Brunnbach is a small river of Bavaria, Germany. It is about 3 kilometres (1.9 mi) long and flows through the district Bogenhausen in Munich. It is a right tributary of the Isar.

== Course ==
The present-day Brunnbach has its source in the bank of the Isar in the former Montgelas Garden in today's Herzogpark area of Bogenhausen. At its beginning, the river crosses several private grounds and partly flows in pipes. A public lawn follows at the Brunnbachleite. After the inn "Wirtshaus im Grüntal" that was closed 2001, the stream runs through private grounds, then follows the Mittlere-Isar-Kanal (a canal) in straight line, flows through the area of the district St. Emmeram of the Bogenhausen district and flows after about 500 meters (1,600 ft) through a sewer pipe under the Mittlere-Isar-Kanal. On the isle of the Isar in Oberföhring, it supplies a pond by means of a pumping station in the landmarked "Pumpenwärterhäuschen" (house of pumping engineer). The majority of its water reaches the surface at the north of the St. Emmeram bridge from a stone mouth designed as fountain, and then flows into the Isar in two arms.

== History ==
Until the end of the 19th century, the Brunnbach had its source near Bad Brunnthal in the lower Bogenhausen and, as it does today, flowed into the Isar at St. Emmeram. From the 10th to the 19th century, it powered four mills in the areas of Grüntal and St. Emmeram.

When the Herzogpark was developed, the Brunnbach was filled in north of Montgelaßstraße. The former upper course in the Maximiliansanlagen park is now a river of its own called Brunnthaler Quellbach.

Because of its purity, the water was regarded as curative water. In the 17th century, Brunnthal became a well-known spa, and its operation was continued until 1914. Even today, the springs of Brunnbach have drinking water quality.

In the course of the uncoverage of the Munich rivers, a renaturation of the Brunnbach was also discussed in the 1990s. Not earlier than 10 years later, the section between the Abacostraße and the Opitzstraße was relocated into a new bed within the municipal green area.

The Brunnbach served Thomas Mann as a model for the river in his novella A Man and His Dog (Herr und Hund).

== See also ==
- List of rivers of Bavaria
