= Munich South Ring =

Railway line in Germany

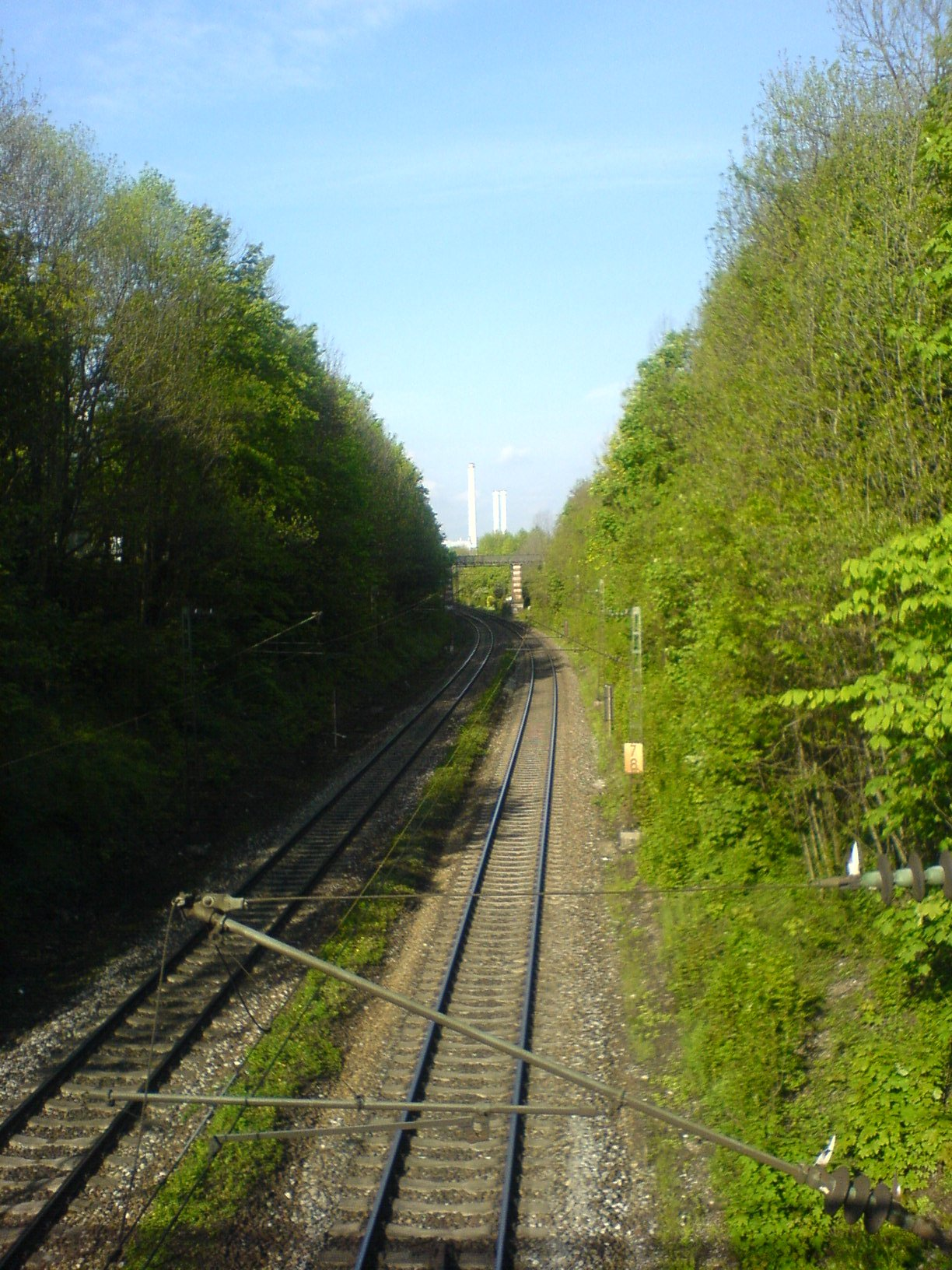
- Munich South Ring

Overview
- Line number: 5510 (München Hbf–München Ost); 5521 (Laim yard–Friedenheimer Brücke junction); 5522 (Laim yard–Pasing); 5531 (Laim yard–München Süd)
- Locale: Bavaria, Germany

Service
- Route number: 940, 950, 951

Technical
- Line length: 9.8 km (6.1 mi) (line 5510); 4.6 km (2.9 mi) (line 5521); 3.6 km (2.2 mi) (line 5522); 5.2 km (3.2 mi) (line 5531); 23.2 km (14.4 mi) (total)

Munich South Ring (German: Münchner Südring) is the common name for a railway line running near the centre and through the southern districts of the Bavarian state capital of Munich. It connects Munich East station to the Munich Central Station (Hauptbahnhof) and Laim marshalling yard. Operationally it is mostly included in the Munich–Rosenheim railway (line 5510).

The South Ring is used by freight traffic as a direct connection between Laim and Munich East, bypassing the Hauptbahnhof. It is used by virtually all passenger trains between the central station and Rosenheim or Mühldorf. Only the Munich S-Bahn services run between the central station and Munich East on a separate line, the S-Bahn trunk line, cutting through the city centre in a tunnel.

Since the S-Bahn line is congested, it has long been debated whether to build another central tunnel as a second trunk line or to upgrade the South Ring for S-Bahn operations. Recently it has been decided to proceed with a second tunnel.

== Route ==
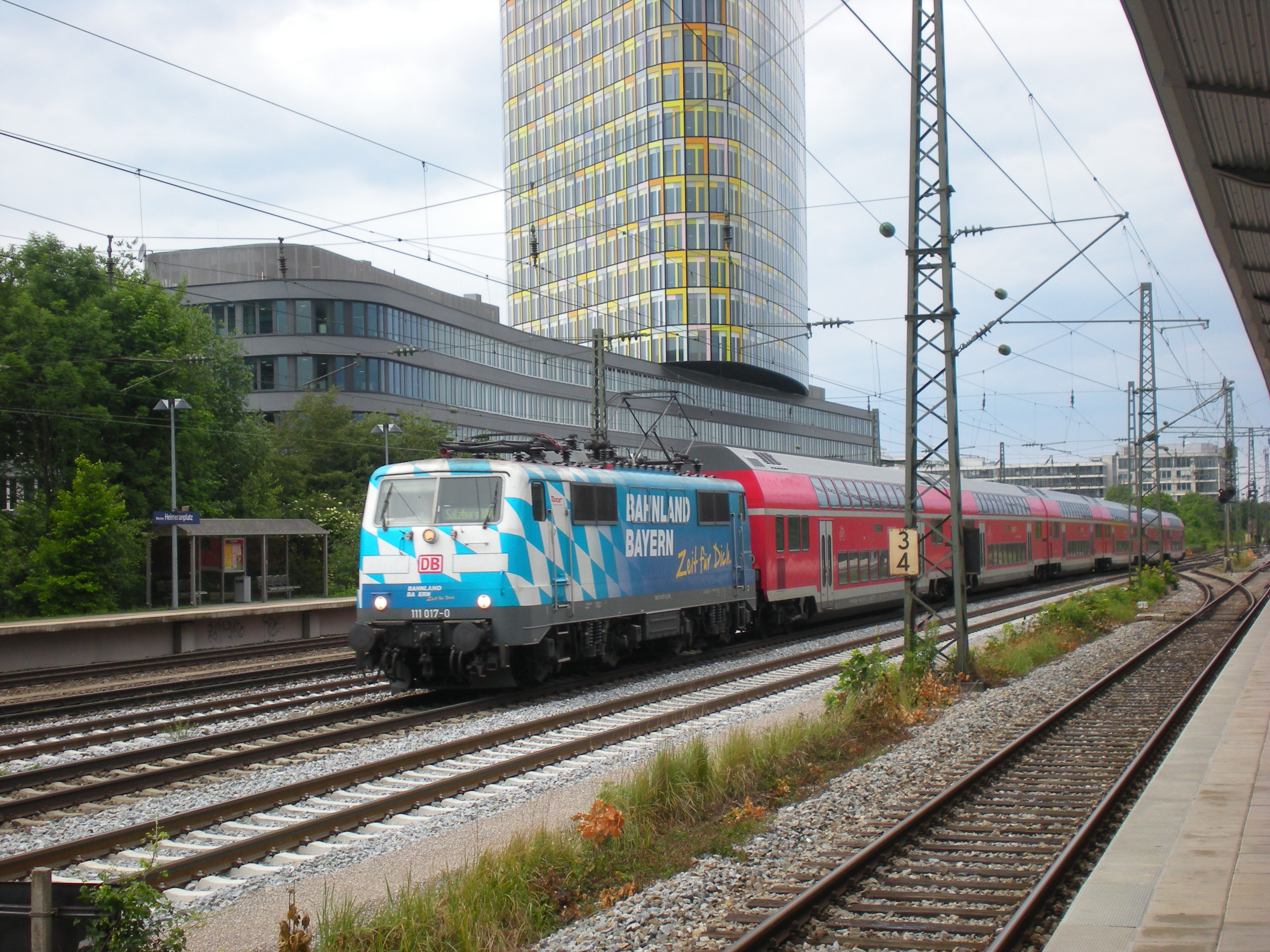
Regional-Express from Munich to Salzburg at Heimeranplatz station

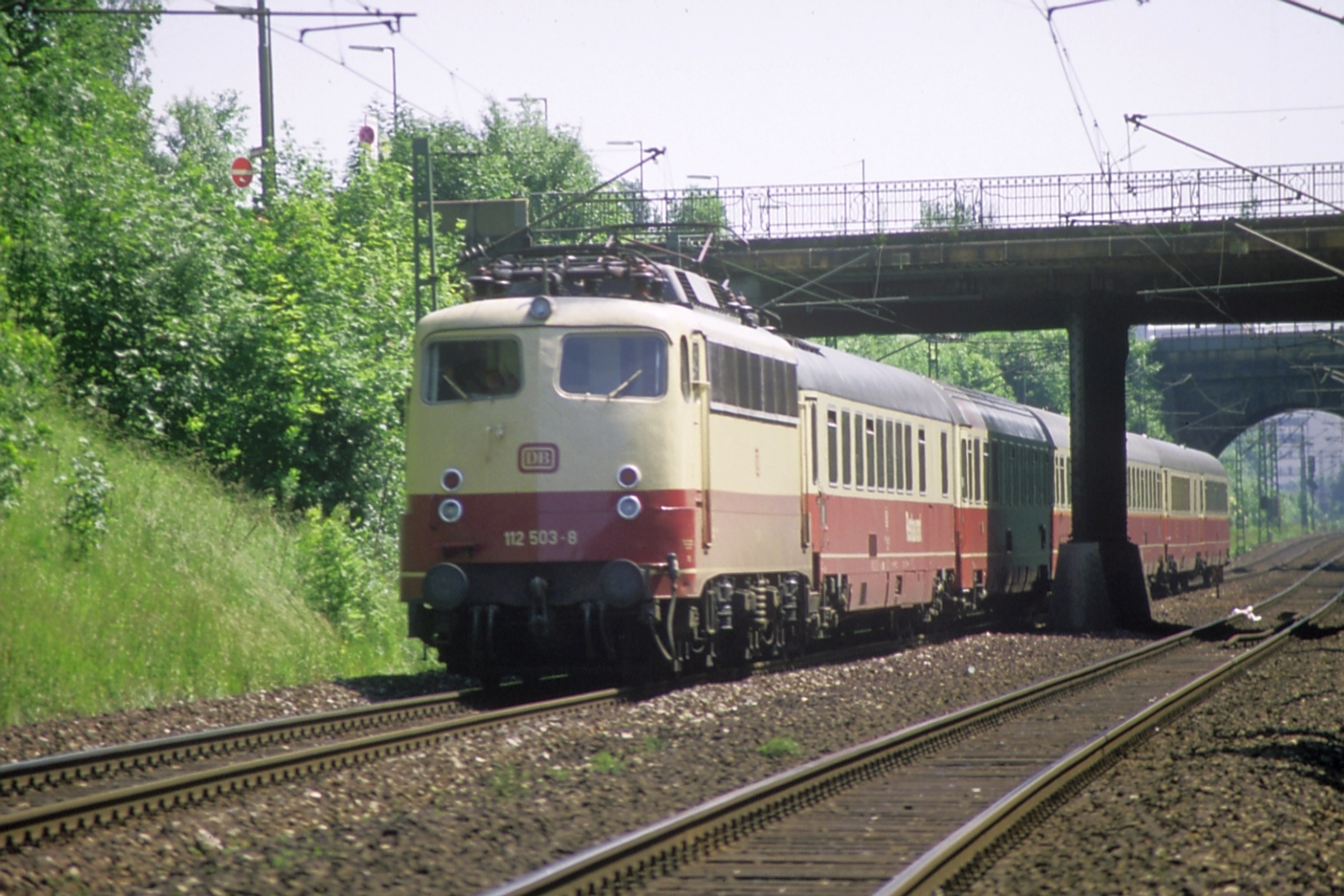
TEE Rheingold, hauled by a class 112 locomotive in 1986 on the Munich South Ring

Since the South Ring is not a separate line, the term is applied to several sections of track. They have in common that they include a link with the freight yard of Munich South station.

Beginning at the East station, the South Ring runs for about 3 km long in a southwesterly direction, and then, after a curve to a northwesterly direction it reaches the Braunauer Railway Bridge (Braunauer Eisenbahnbrücke). After crossing the Isar, the line reaches Munich South station.

South of this station there are connections to the wholesale market and Heizkraftwerk Süd (combined heat and power station south) and many sidings of the station.

At South Station, the line forks to Laim marshalling yard. This runs to Heimeranplatz station parallel with the line to the central station. The line runs as four tracks through a 330 m-long (1,080 ft) tunnel between Radlkoferstraße and Ganghoferstraße, passing under the former exhibition grounds. Both routes pass under the southern S-Bahn line from Solln.

The line then approaches the Heimeranplatz S-Bahn station. North of Heimeranplatz the South Ring divides into a branch to the central station, a branch to Laim marshalling yard and a branch to Pasing, known as the Sendlinger Spange ("Sendling clasp").

=== Freight ===
Freight travels on the South Ring usually via the tunnel from Laim marshalling yard to Heimeranplatz. Trains on the South Ring usually run towards Mühldorf and the Riem container depot, as this line is not connected to the Northern Ring. Some trains on the South Ring also run towards Rosenheim. This traffic usually, however, uses the Northern Ring.

== S-Bahn ==
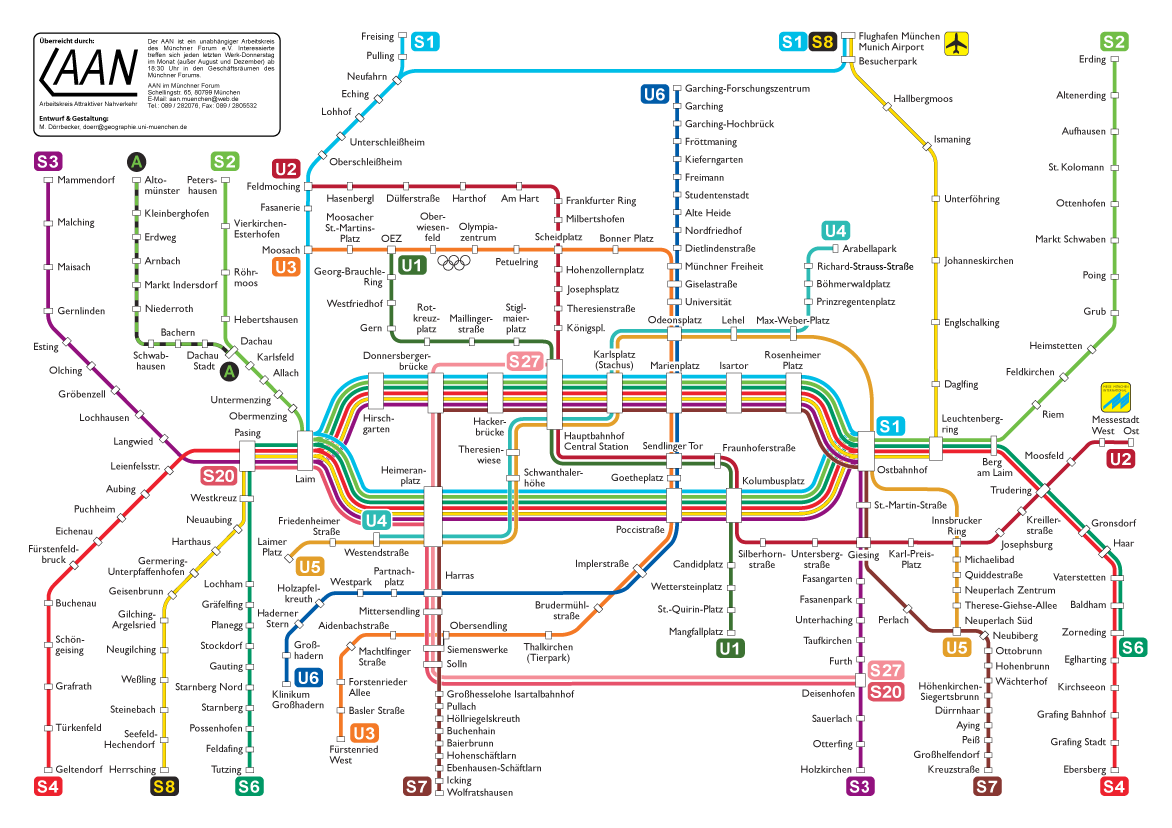
The second S-Bahn trunk line in the "South Ring" planning option

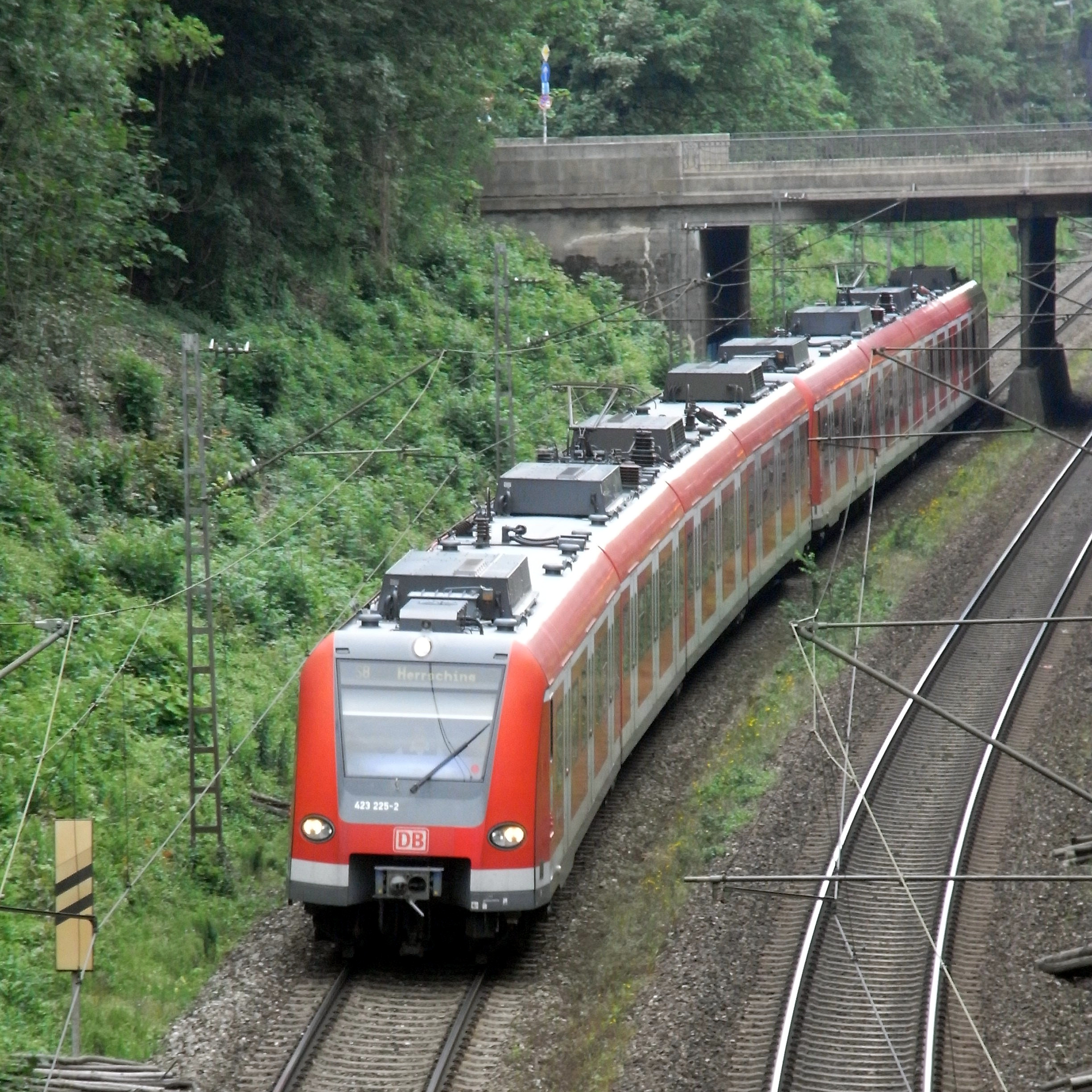
S-Bahn line S 8 service on the South Ring due to a blockade of the trunk line in the summer of 2011

The South Ring is used by line S 20 between Pasing and Heimeranplatz, as well as S-Bahn lines S 7 and S 27 on the section between Donnersbergerbrücke and Heimeranplatz. The S-Bahn trains branch off in Heimeranplatz towards Solln and Deisenhofen.

During partial closures of the S-Bahn, the South Ring is used as a detour route. During the blockade of the trunk line in June and July 2012, the S 8 service was diverted by the South Ring, when it ran through the line from the East station to Pasing without stopping.

Since the S-Bahn tunnel route from the central station to the East station is at the limit of its capacity, the South Ring was investigated as to whether it could be upgraded into a second S-Bahn route. In several comparative studies, however, a tunnel to the north of the current trunk line was given preference. However, citizens' groups and critics continue to call for an upgrading of the South Ring instead of a tunnel.
