= Munich Siemenswerke station =

Railway station in Germany

München Siemenswerke
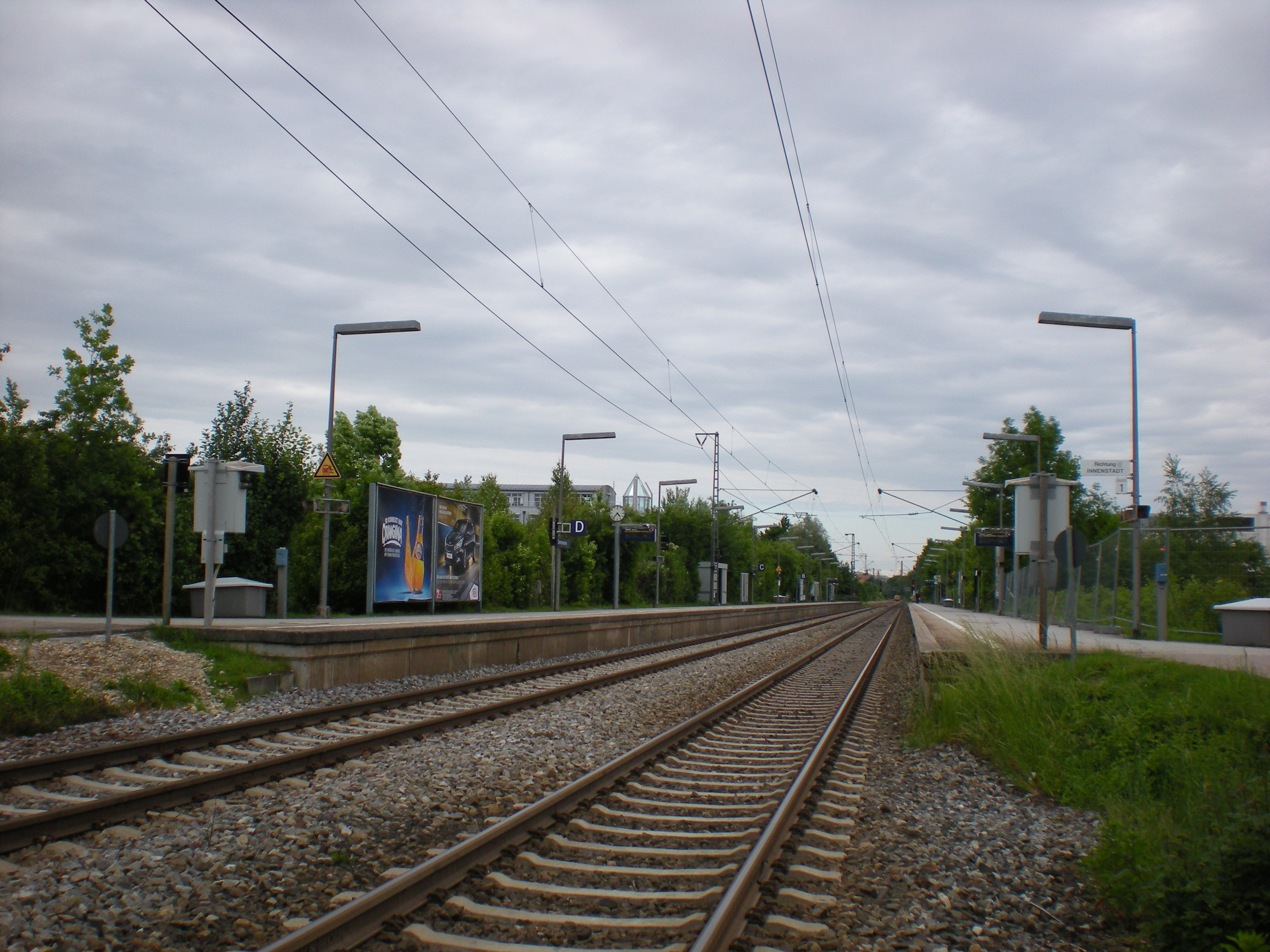
- 2012

General information
- Location: Rupert-Mayer-Straße; 81379 Munich; Thalkirchen-Obersendling-Forstenried-Fürstenried-Solln; Bavaria; Germany
- Coordinates: 48°5′42″N 11°31′59″E
- Owner: DB Netz
- Operator: DB Station&Service
- Lines: Munich–Holzkirchen railway (KBS 955)
- Platforms: 2 side platforms
- Tracks: 2
- Train operators: Bayerische Oberlandbahn; S-Bahn München
- Connections: 136

Construction
- Parking: no
- Cycle facilities: yes
- Accessible: yes

Other information
- Station code: 4244
- DS100 code: MSW
- IBNR: 8004137
- Category: 4
- Fare zone: : M
- Website: www.bahnhof.de

Services
Preceding station		Following station
Holzkirchen towards Schliersee or Bayrischzell	RB 55 Mo-Fr	Harras towards München Hbf
Holzkirchen towards Lenggries	RB 56 Mo-Fr	Harras towards München Hbf
Holzkirchen towards Tegernsee	RB 57 Mo-Fr	Harras towards München Hbf
Deisenhofen towards Rosenheim	RB 58 Mo-Fr	Munich-Mittersendling towards München Hbf
Preceding station	Munich S-Bahn	Following station
Solln towards Wolfratshausen	S7	Mittersendling towards München Hbf
Solln towards Höllriegelskreuth	S20	Mittersendling towards Geltendorf
Location
- Location within Bavaria Location within Germany Location within Europe

Munich Siemenswerke station is a Munich S-Bahn railway station on the Bayerische Oberlandbahn main line in the borough of Obersendling. It is named after a large Siemens complex formerly located west of the station. Today, large parts of this complex have been transformed into a residential area.

The Obersendling U-Bahn station is located 500m north of this station.
