= Munich Donnersbergerbrücke station =

Munich S-Bahn station

München Donnersbergerbrücke
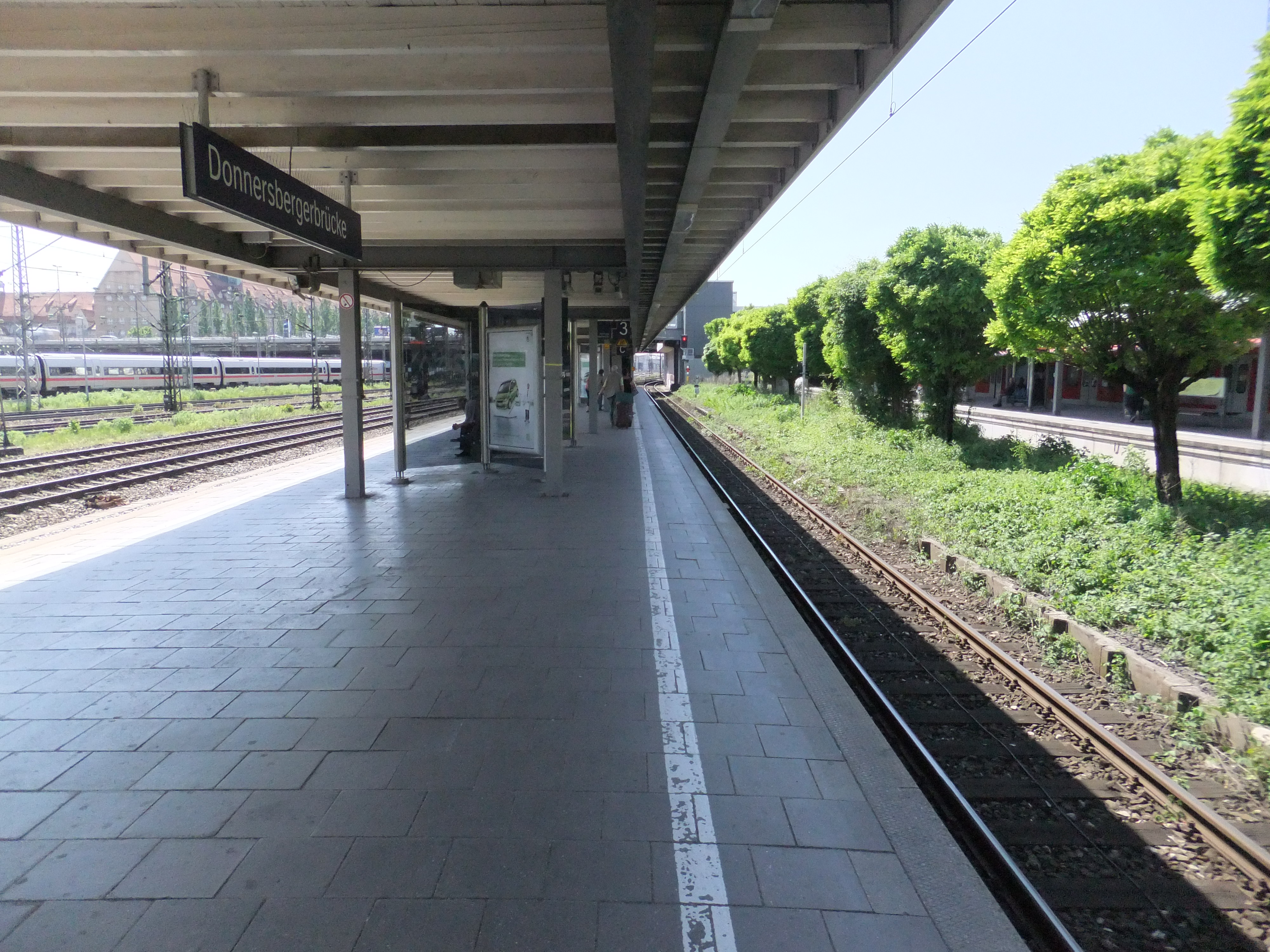
- The platforms

General information
- Location: Neuhausen-Nymphenburg, Munich, Bavaria; Germany
- Coordinates: 48°8′34″N 11°32′6″E
- Owner: DB Netz
- Operator: DB Station&Service
- Lines: Munich–Holzkirchen (KBS 955 / 956); S-Bahn trunk line (KBS 999)
- Platforms: 2 island platforms
- Tracks: 4
- Train operators: Bayerische Oberlandbahn; S-Bahn München
- Connections: , 153, X30

Construction
- Accessible: Yes

Other information
- Station code: 4231
- DS100 code: MMDN
- Category: 3
- Fare zone: : M
- Website: stationsdatenbank.de; www.bahnhof.de

History
- Opened: 1 September 1895

Services
Preceding station	Munich S-Bahn	Following station
Hirschgarten towards Freising or Flughafen	S1	Hackerbrücke towards Leuchtenbergring
Hirschgarten towards Petershausen or Altomünster	S2	Hackerbrücke towards Erding
Hirschgarten towards Mammendorf	S3	Hackerbrücke towards Holzkirchen
Hirschgarten towards Geltendorf	S4	Hackerbrücke towards Ebersberg
Hirschgarten towards Weßling	S5	Hackerbrücke towards Kreuzstraße
Hirschgarten towards Tutzing	S6	Hackerbrücke towards Ebersberg
Heimeranplatz towards Wolfratshausen	S7	Hackerbrücke towards München Hbf
Hirschgarten towards Herrsching	S8	Hackerbrücke towards Flughafen
Preceding station		Following station
Munich Harras towards Schliersee or Bayrischzell	RB 55	München Hbf Terminus
Munich Harras towards Lenggries	RB 56	München Hbf Terminus
Munich Harras towards Tegernsee	RB 57	München Hbf Terminus
Munich Heimeranplatz towards Rosenheim	RB 58	München Hbf Terminus
Location

Munich Donnersbergerbrücke station is a station with four platform tracks in the Schwanthalerhöhe district of the Bavarian state capital of Munich and a hub of the Munich S-Bahn. Here line S 7 separates towards Wolfratshausen from the S-Bahn trunk line. It is also served by services of the Bayerische Oberlandbahn on the Munich–Holzkirchen railway on the S-Bahn trunk line. The station is located east of the Donnersberger Bridge (German: Donnersbergerbrücke).

== History ==
München-Hauptwerkstätte station was opened on 1 September 1895 at the site of the now four-track station served by the S-Bahn and the Bayerische Oberlandbahn (BOB), adjacent to the workshop of the Deutsche Reichsbahn and its forerunners that it was named after. In the 1920s, it was renamed Zentralwerkstätte (central workshop). Only at 23 May 1971, that is one year before the launch of the Munich S-Bahn on 28 May 1972, the station was given its present name. At the beginning of the S-Bahn operations there were only two platform tracks with a central platform located where there is now green space between tracks 2 and 3. At the end of the 1970s, the two current platforms were built and put into operation on 31 May 1981 at the same time as the Southern lines tunnel (Südstreckentunnel) was built for connecting the Munich–Holzkirchen railway and line S 7 from Wolfratshausen. As a result, this line, which as line S 10 previously ended at Munich Central Station (Hauptbahnhof), was connected with the S-Bahn trunk line tunnel. The Southern line tunnel has been used since 1998 by the Bayerische Oberlandbahn. Using a flying junction to the east of the station, it is possible for the BOB services and S-Bahn line S 27 to continue to the northern wing station of the Hauptbahnhof (also’ known as the Starnberger Flügelbahnhof—“Starnberg Wing Station”).

== Infrastructure ==
Platform track 1 is used by S-Bahn lines 1 to 6 and 8 running out of the city. The next station is Hirschgarten. The Bayerische Oberlandbahn and lines S 7 and S 27 heading out of the city stop on track 2. Immediately after the platform these services pass under all the other tracks towards the Central Station in a tunnel in order, after a long left turn and the crossing of Landsbergerstraße, to reach Heimeranplatz station where it is possible to transfer to U-Bahn lines U 4 and U 5. Track 3 is used by all S-Bahn services from Laim/Pasing. Track 4, similarly to track 2, is used by BOB and S-Bahn services on lines S 7 and S 27 towards the city. Both central platforms are 210 metres long and 96 cm high.

The platforms are linked by a separate bridge west of the platforms. This bridge is also connected to the Donnersbergerbrücke, where the buses on lines 53, 133 and N99 stop.

== Rail services ==
The station is served by S-Bahn lines S1, S2, S3, S4, S6, S7 and S8, each operating at 20-minute intervals. It is also served by some services of the Bayerische Regiobahn.

Line	Route	Frequency	Operator
RB 55	München Hbf – München Donnersbergerbrücke – Holzkirchen – Schliersee – Bayrischzell	60 min	Bayerische Regiobahn
RB 56	München Hbf – München Donnersbergerbrücke – Holzkirchen – Bad Tölz – Lenggries	60 min	Bayerische Regiobahn
RB 57	München Hbf – München Donnersbergerbrücke – Holzkirchen – Finsterwald – Tegernsee	60 min	Bayerische Regiobahn
RB 58	München Hbf – München Donnersbergerbrücke – Deisenhofen – Holzkirchen – Bad Aibling – Rosenheim	30 min to Deisenhofen, 60 min to Rosenheim	Bayerische Regiobahn

== Vicinity ==
A new housing development, the Arnulfpark, is being built northeast of the Donnersbergerbrücke. Southwest of the station is the main customs office, with its distinctive dome.

== Gallery ==
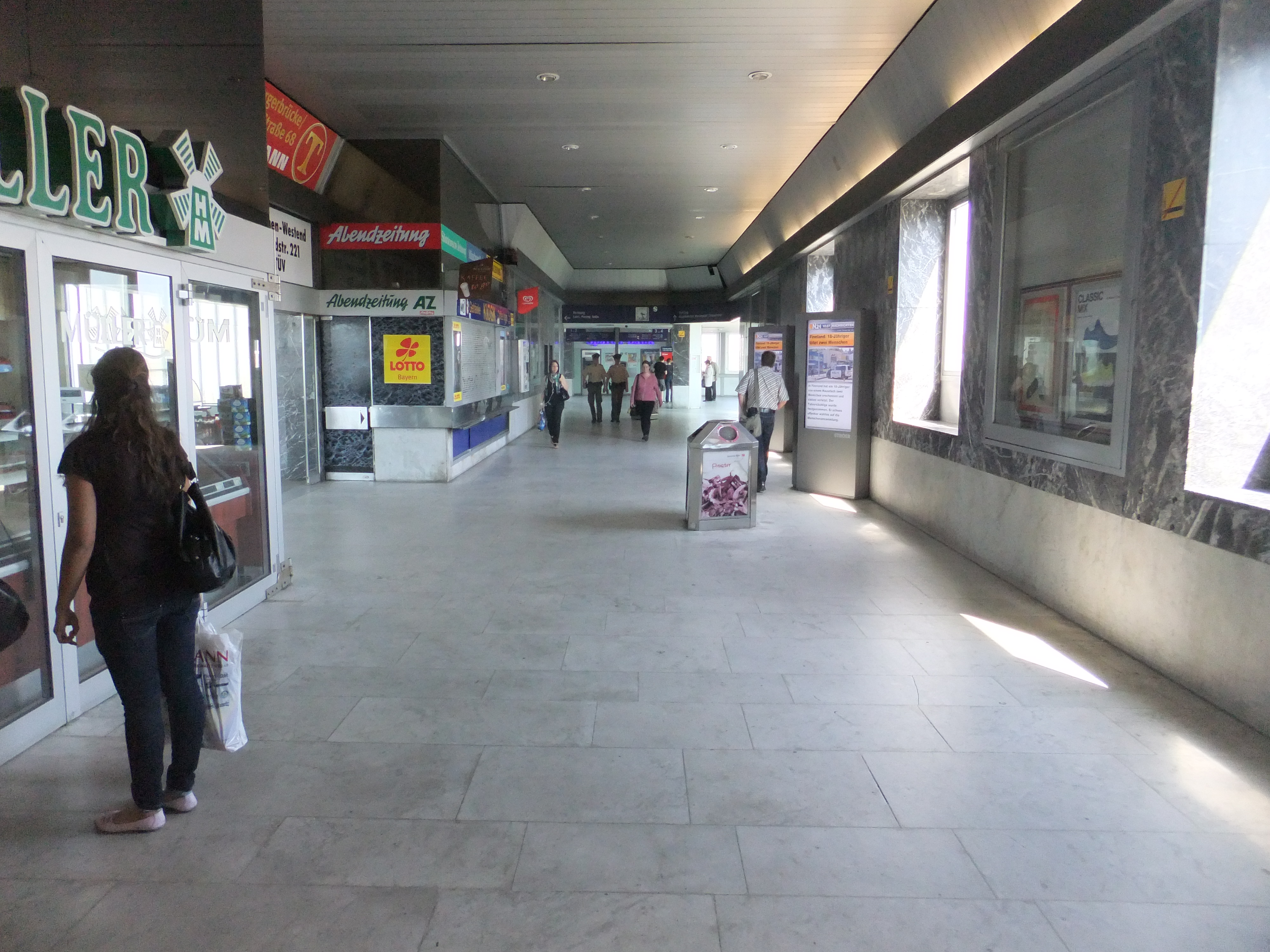
The main hall of Donnersbergerbrücke station

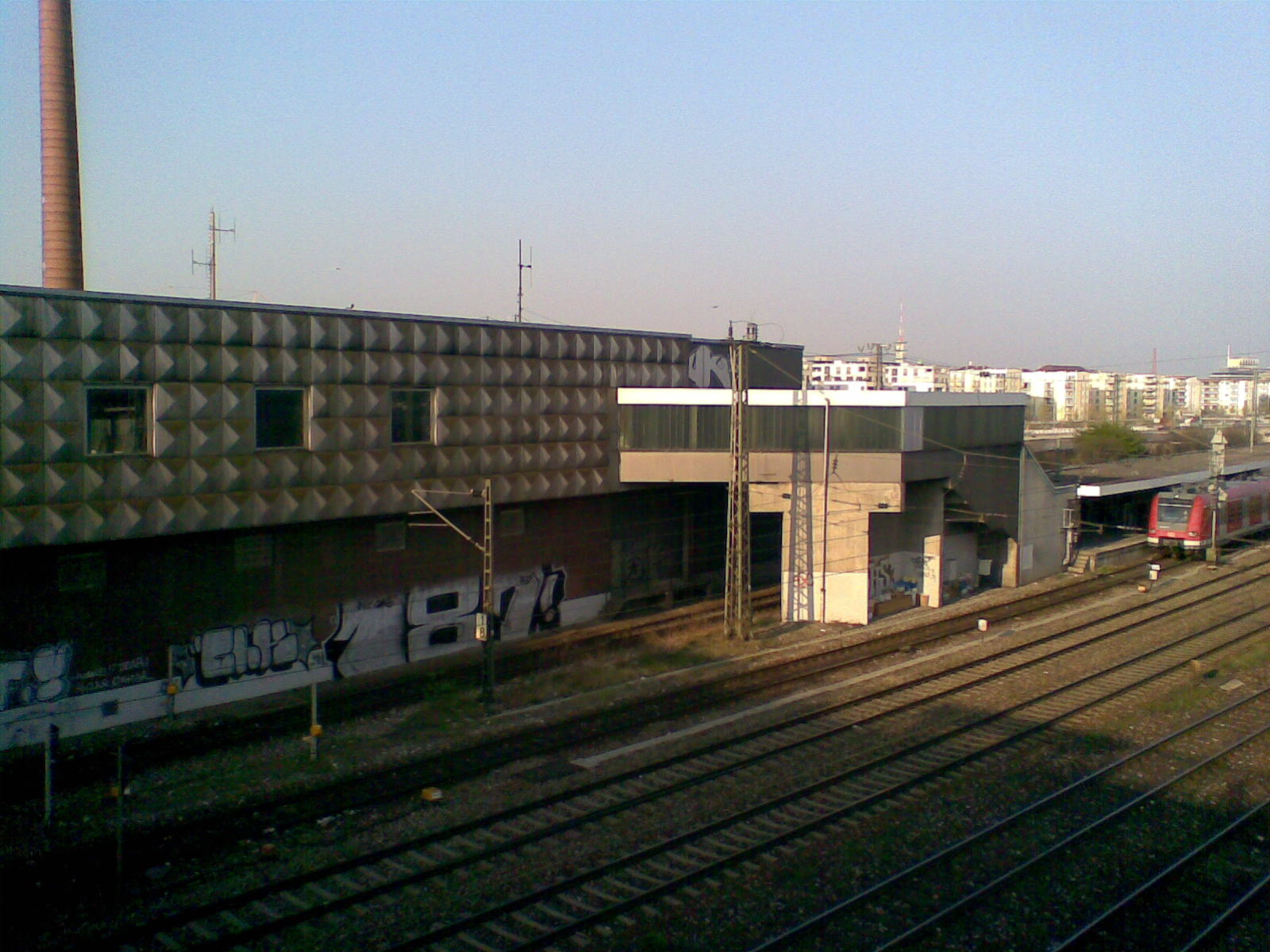
Donnersbergerbrücke station from the south; S7 service on track 4

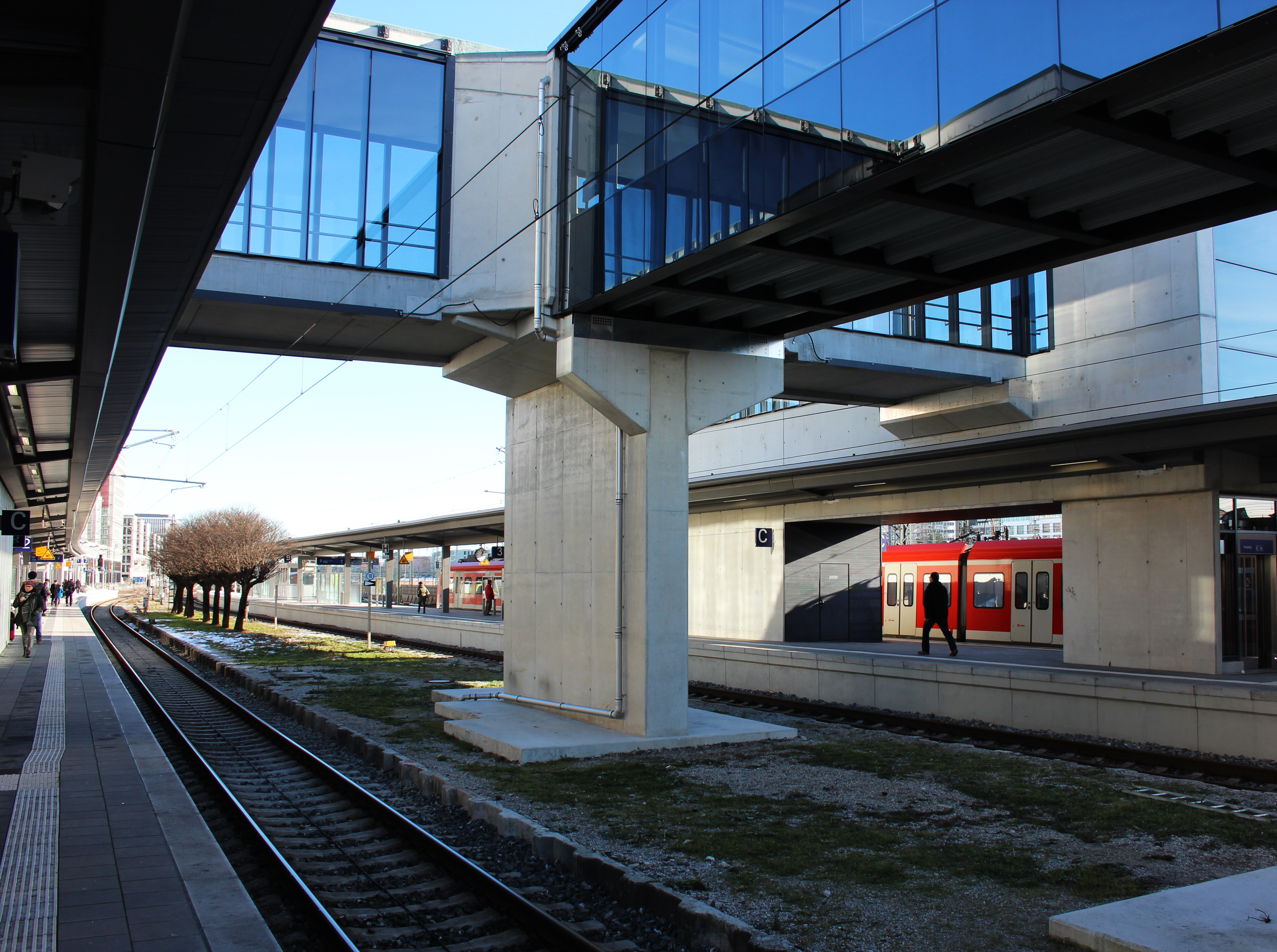
Newly built platforms in 2015

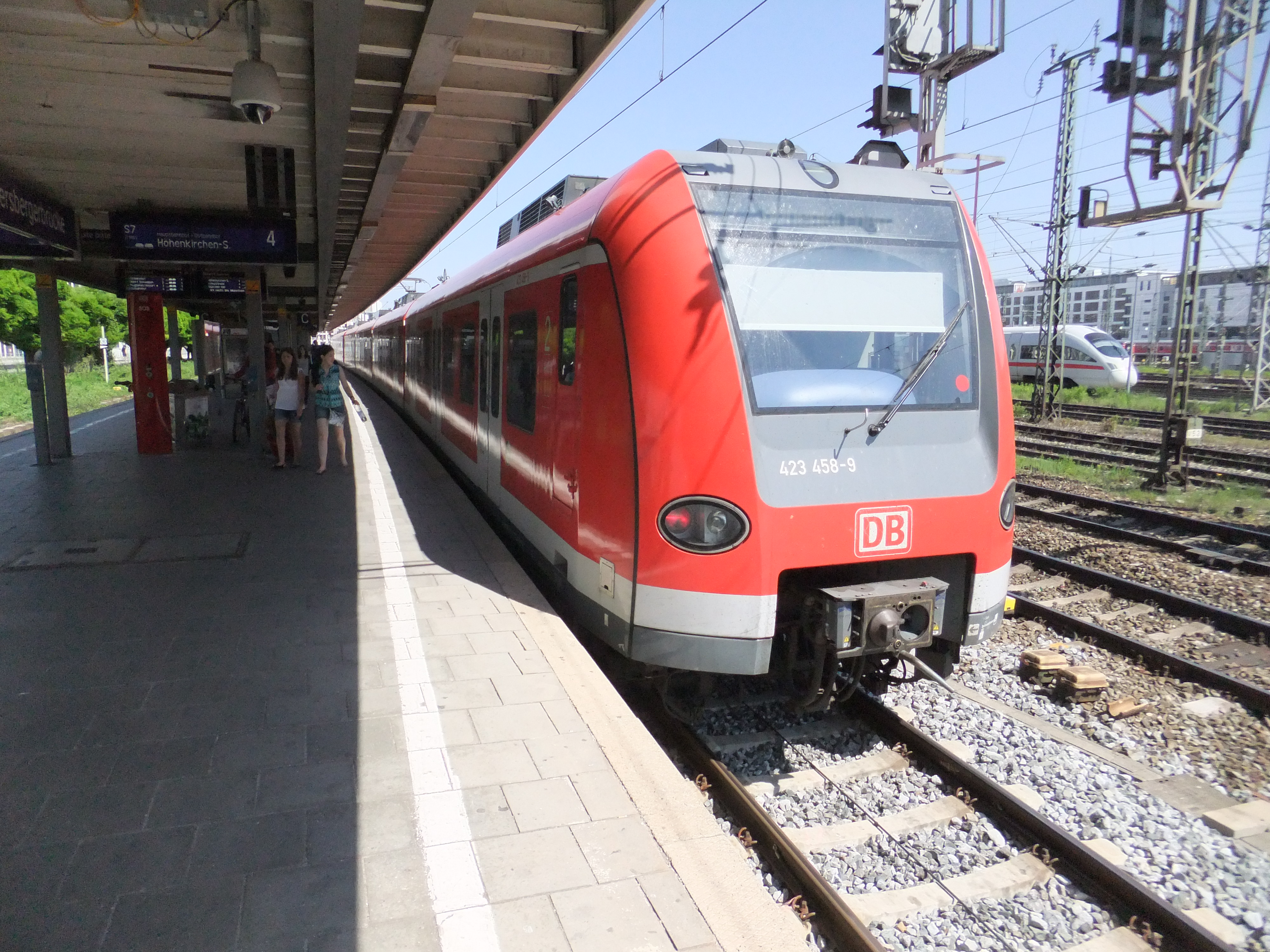
Class 423 of the Munich S-Bahn running as line S7 in the station
