= S27 (Munich) =

German railway

Overview
- Line number: S27
- Locale: Munich, Bavaria, Germany

Service
- System: Munich S-Bahn
- Route number: 999.27
- Operator(s): S-Bahn Munich
- Rolling stock: DBAG Class 423

History
- Closed: 15 December 2013; 12 years ago

Technical
- Electrification: 15 kV, 16.7 Hz AC Overhead lines

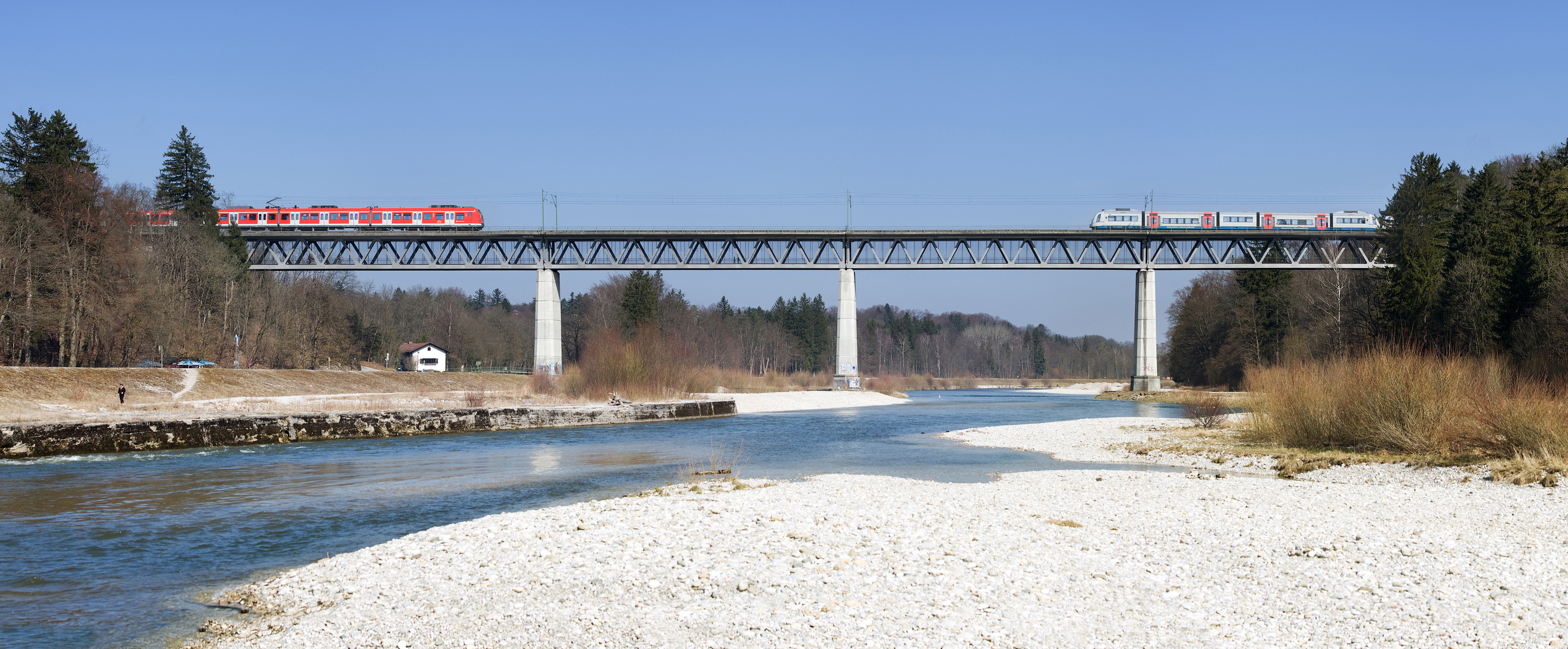
The new Großhesselohe Bridge with a train of the Bayerische Oberlandbahn towards Munich Central Station (right) and a S 27 service towards Deisenhofen (left)

Line S27 was a former line on the Munich S-Bahn network. It was operated by DB Regio Bayern until 15 December 2013 and ran from Munich Central Station (Hauptbahnhof) via Solln to Deisenhofen over the Munich–Holzkirchen railway. Its services have been replaced by services operated by Meridian, a brand of Veolia Verkehr, initially using class 423 four-car electrical multiple units. These services run from Munich to Holzkirchen and continuing via the Mangfall Valley Railway to Rosenheim.

S-Bahn services commenced on 28 May 1972 as S-Bahn line 22 between Holzkirchen wing station (Holzkirchner Flügelbahnhof) of Munich Hauptbahnhof and Deisenhofen as they could not yet continue to the Starnberg wing station of the Hauptbahnhof because the southern lines tunnel, which passes under the long-distance tracks towards Pasing and the S-Bahn trunk line, was not yet available. With the opening of the southern lines tunnel on the S-Bahn route on 31 May 1981, the S-Bahn line from Deisenhofen continued to the Starnberg wing station.
