= Munich-Mittersendling station =

Railway station in Munich, Germany

Mittersendling
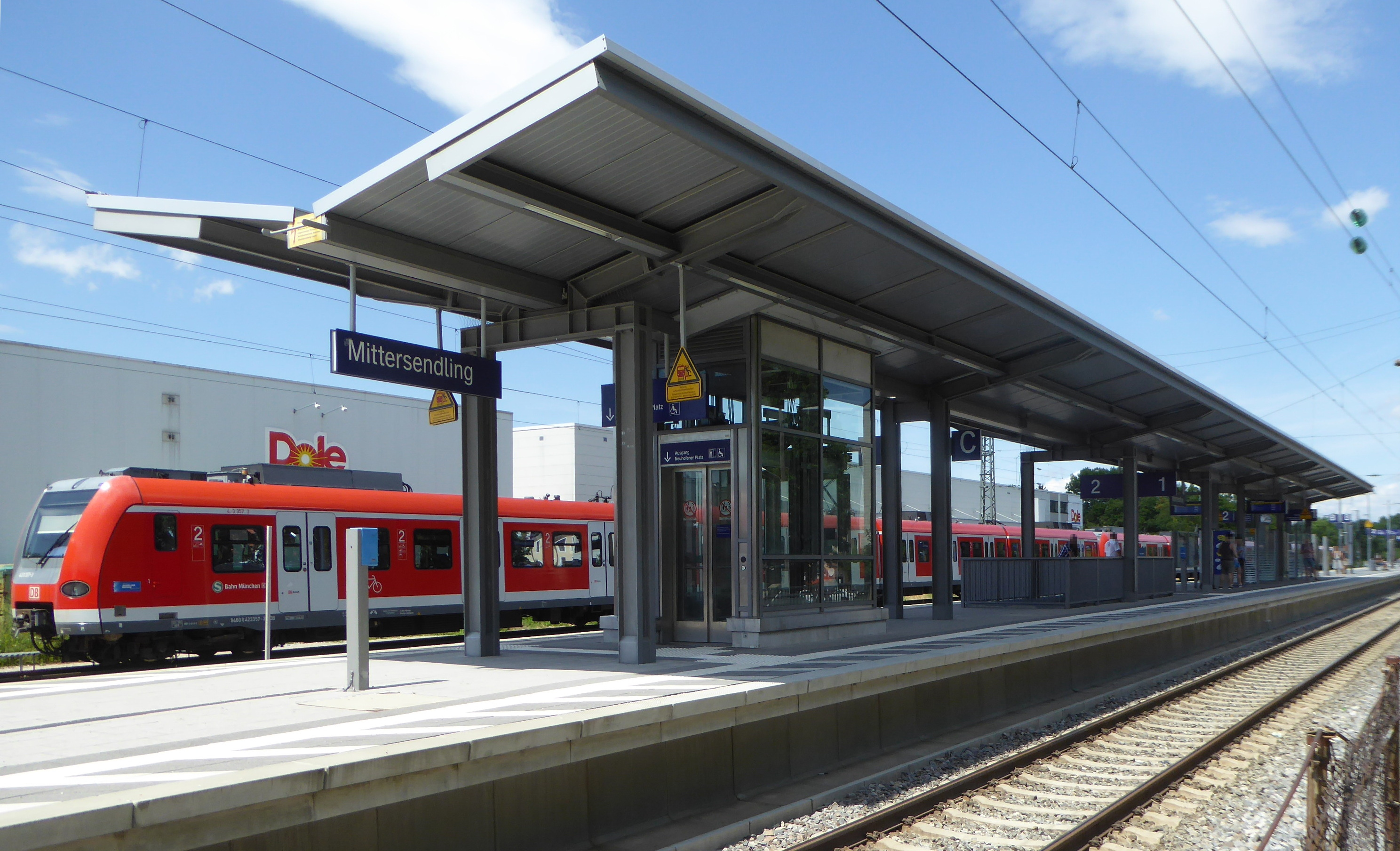

General information
- Location: Sendling, Munich, Bavaria; Germany
- Coordinates: 48°06′28″N 11°32′11″E
- Owner: DB Netz
- Operator: DB Station&Service
- Lines: Munich–Holzkirchen (KBS 955 / 956)
- Platforms: 2

Other information
- Station code: n/a
- DS100 code: MMT
- Category: 4
- Fare zone: : M
- Website: www.bahnhof.de

Services
Preceding station		Following station
Munich Siemenswerke towards Rosenheim	RB 58 Mo-Fr	Munich Harras towards München Hbf
Preceding station	Munich S-Bahn	Following station
Siemenswerke towards Wolfratshausen	S7	Harras towards München Hbf
Siemenswerke towards Höllriegelskreuth	S20	Heimeranplatz towards Geltendorf
Location
- Location within Bavaria Location within Germany Location within Europe

Munich-Mittersendling station is a Munich S-Bahn railway station in the borough of Mittersendling. It has an access for disabled people.

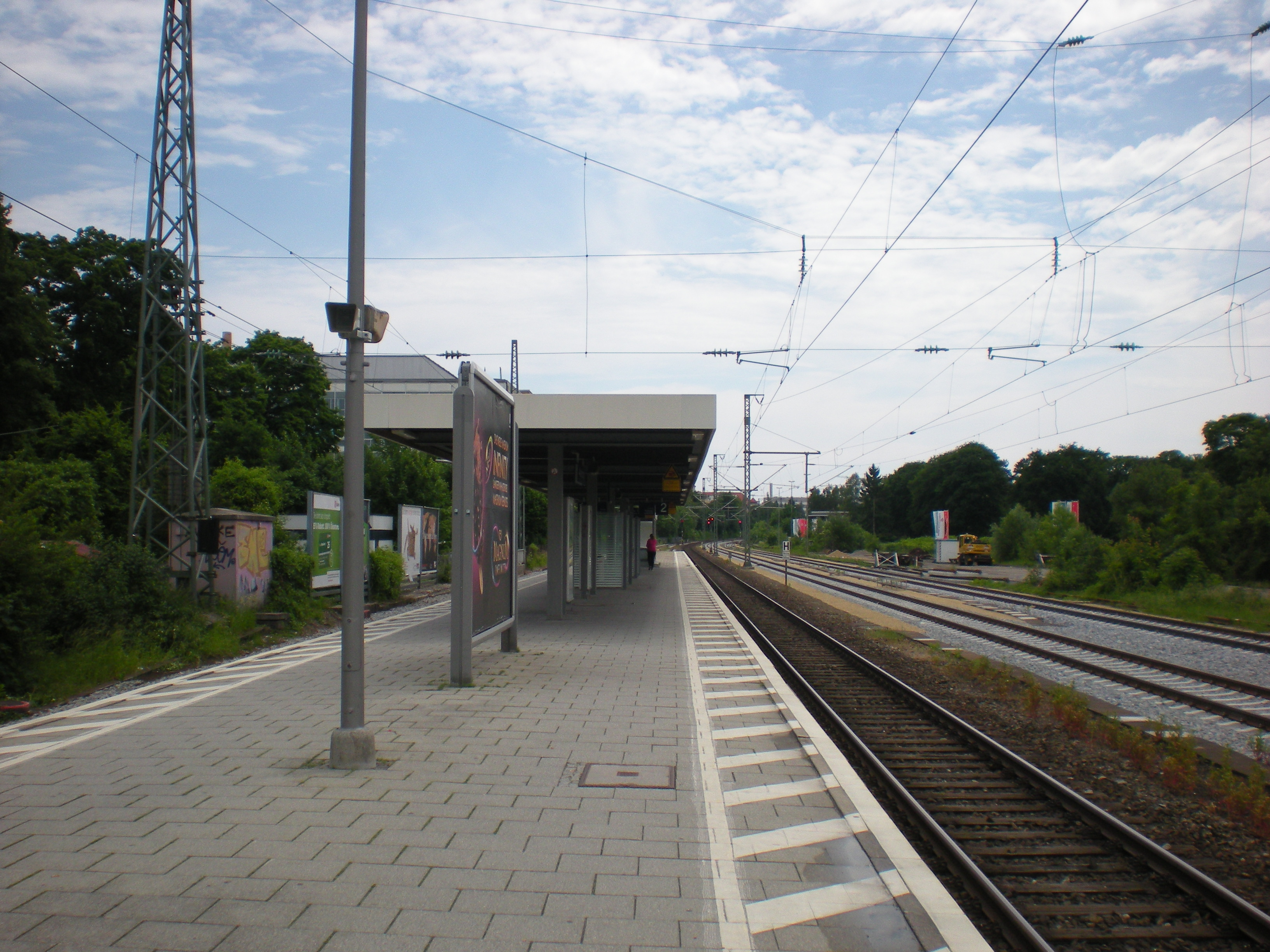
The station before its renovation in 2012
