= Holzkirchen station =

Railway station in Germany

Holzkirchen
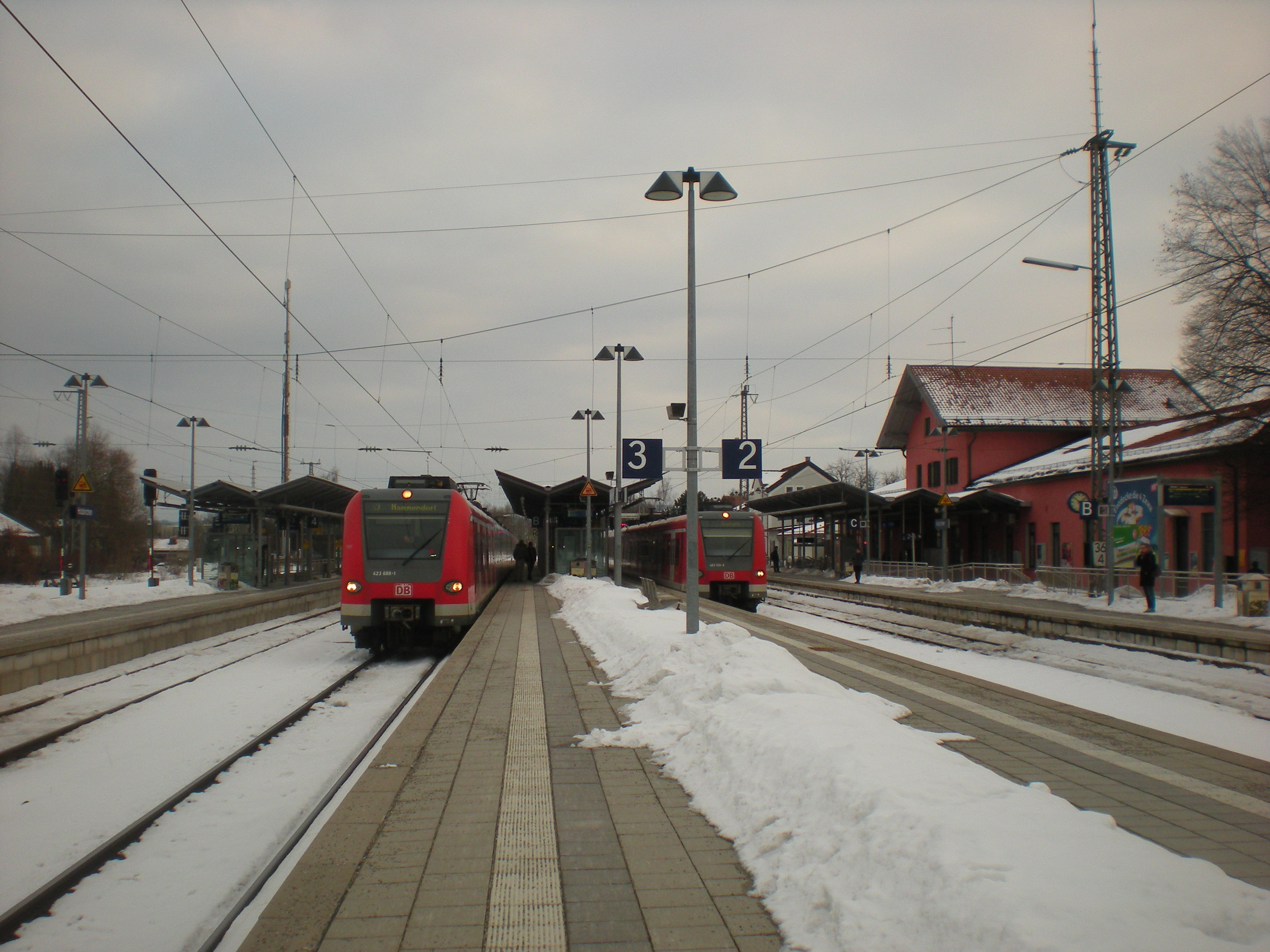

General information
- Location: Bahnhofsplatz 1; 83607 Holzkirchen; Bavaria; Germany
- Coordinates: 47.884547°N 11.696923°E
- Owner: Deutsche Bahn
- Operator: DB Netz; DB Station&Service
- Lines: Munich–Holzkirchen railway Mangfall Valley Railway; Holzkirchen–Lenggries railway Holzkirchen–Schliersee railway
- Platforms: 3
- Tracks: 5
- Train operators: Bayerische Regiobahn; S-Bahn München
- Connections: 275, 353, 361, 366, 367, 368

Other information
- Station code: 2888
- DS100 code: MHO
- IBNR: 8002980
- Category: 3
- Fare zone: : 3 and 4
- Website: www.bahnhof.de

History
- Opened: 31 October 1857

Services
Preceding station		Following station
Munich-Solln towards München Hbf	RB 55	Darching towards Bayrischzell
Munich-Solln towards München Hbf	RB 56	Warngau towards Lenggries
Munich-Solln towards München Hbf	RB 57	Warngau towards Tegernsee
Deisenhofen Mo-Fr towards München Hbf	RB 58	Kreuzstraße towards Rosenheim
Preceding station	Munich S-Bahn	Following station
Otterfing towards Mammendorf	S3	Terminus
Location
- Location within Bavaria Location within Germany Location within Europe

Holzkirchen station is a railway station on the Munich S-Bahn in the district of Holzkirchen in Upper Bavaria, Germany. It is served by the S-Bahn line S3 and Bayerische Regiobahn.

== Location ==
Holzkirchen station is a junction station where the Munich–Holzkirchen railway, Mangfall Valley Railway (to Rosenheim), Holzkirchen–Lenggries railway and Holzkirchen–Schliersee railway join together.

== History ==
Holzkirchen station was opened on 31 October 1857 together with the section Großhesselohe-Rosenheim the Bavarian Maximilian Railway. The entire Maximilian Railway Ulm-Munich-Salzburg was completed on 1 August 1860. On 23 November 1861 a route to Miesbach was opened so that Holzkirchen became a railway junction. In 1862, the Munich–Holzkirchen railway was double-tracked due to the increasing volume of traffic. In 1868 the Holzkirchen-Miesbach line was extended to Hausham and in 1869 to Schliersee. On 15 October 1871, the Munich–Rosenheim railway (Munich-Grafing-Rosenheim) was opened, which made the previous detour of the Maximilian Railway over Holzkirchen unnecessary. Since most of the trains went via Grafing, the Bavarian Maximilian Railway and the Holzkirchen station lost their traffic.

On 1 June 1874 another outgoing line from Holzkirchen route to Bad Tölz was opened.

On 24 November 2009, there was a motor fire in an Integral train of the Bayerische Oberlandbahn.

== Gallery ==
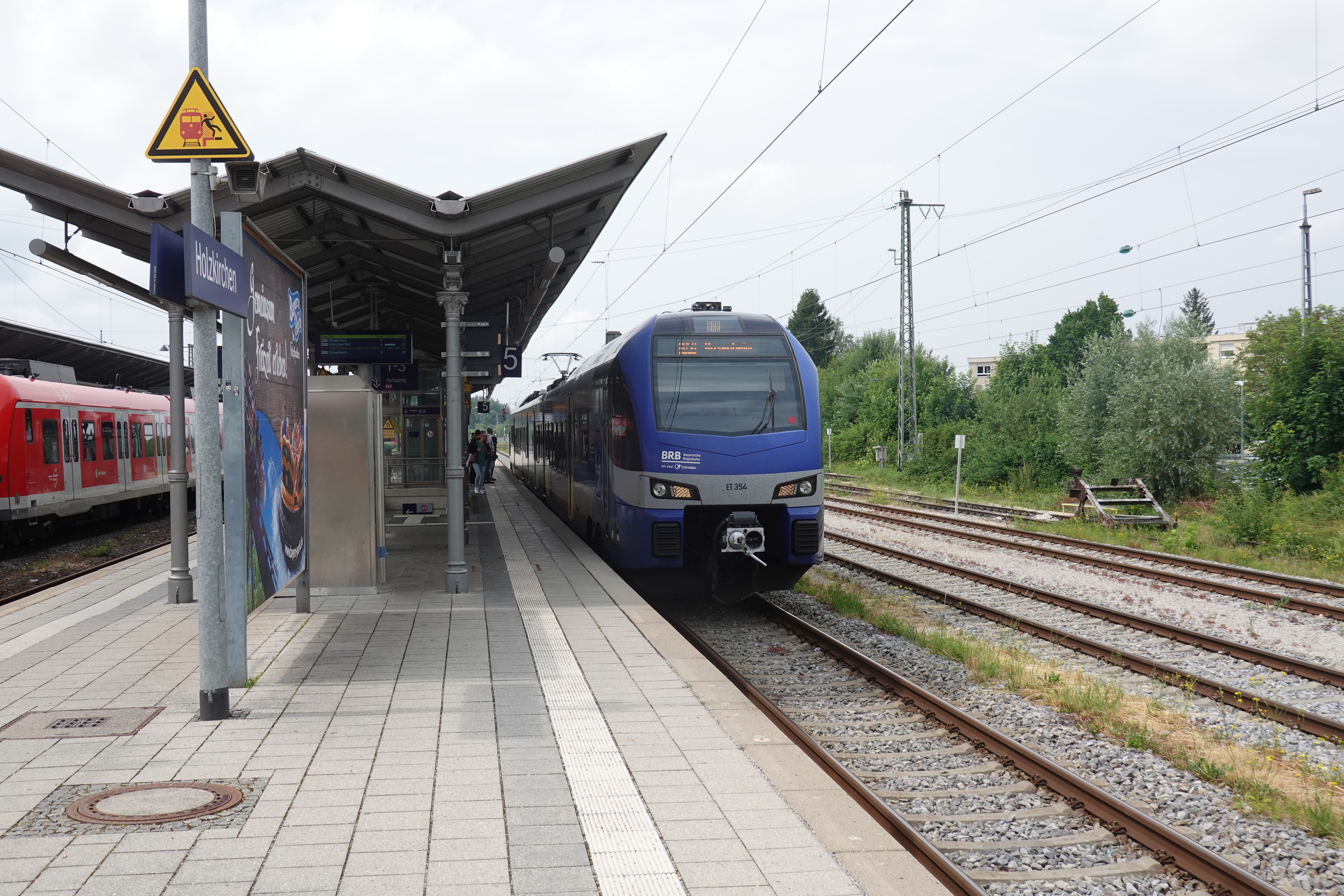
Bayrische Regiobahn at track 5 in 2023

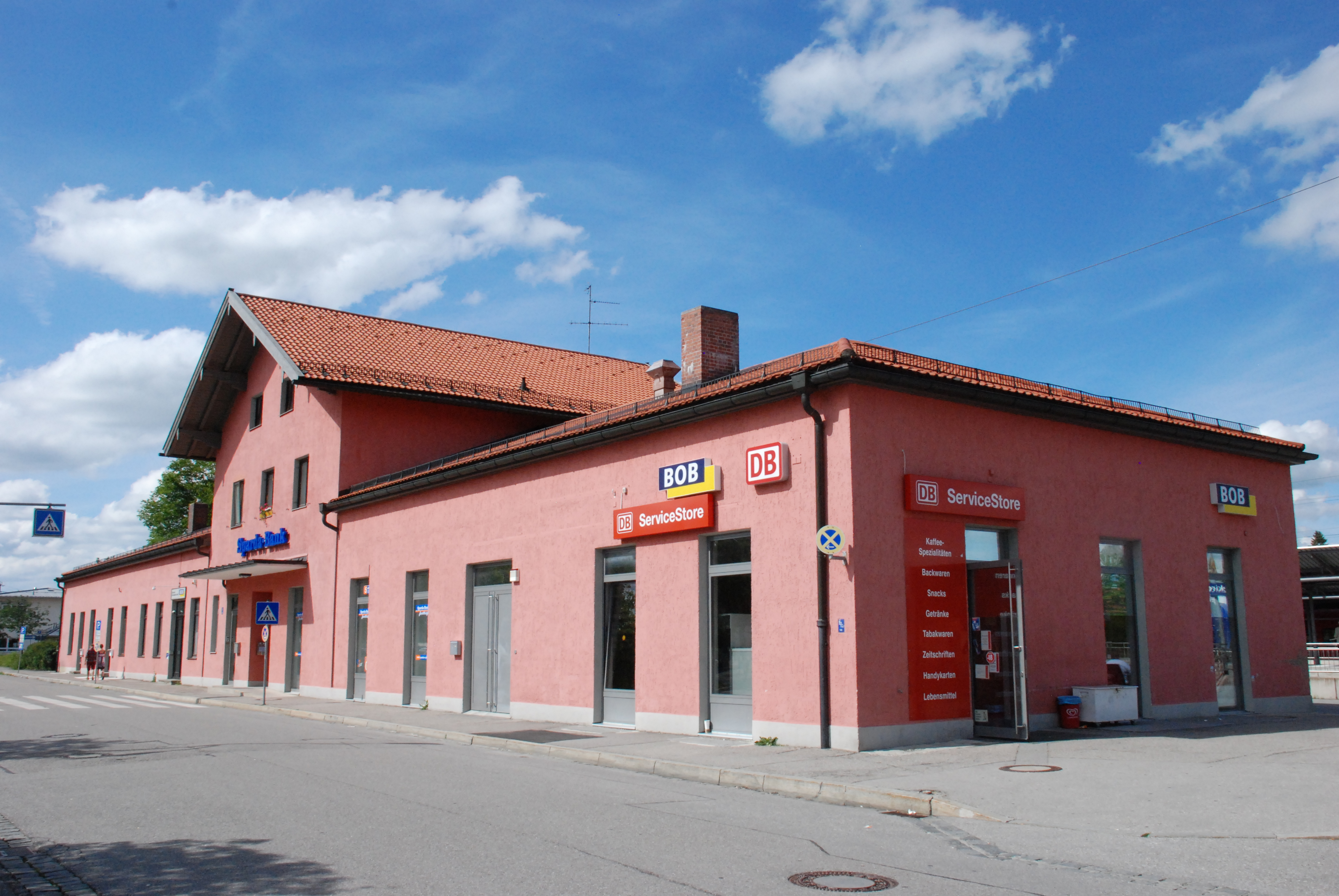
Reception building in 2011
