= S27 =

S27 may refer to:

== Aviation ==
- Blériot-SPAD S.27, a French biplane airliner
- Kalispell City Airport, in Flathead County, Montana, United States
- Short S.27, a British military trainer
- Sikorsky S-27, a Russian biplane bomber

== Rail and transit ==
- S27 (Long Island bus), United States
- S27 (Munich), a line of the Munich S-Bahn, Germany
- S27 (Südostbahn), a railway service in Switzerland
- S27, an Aargau S-Bahn line in Switzerland and Germany
- Rankoshi Station, in Hokkaido, Japan

== Other uses ==
- 40S ribosomal protein S27
- British NVC community S27, a swamps and tall-herb fens community in the British National Vegetation Classification system
- County Route S27 (California)
- HMS Revenge (S27), a submarine of the Royal Navy
- S27: Take off immediately all contaminated clothing, a safety phrase
- Sulfur-27, an isotope of sulfur
- USS S-27 (SS-132), a submarine of the United States Navy
