= Munich-Solln station =

Railway station in Germany

München Solln
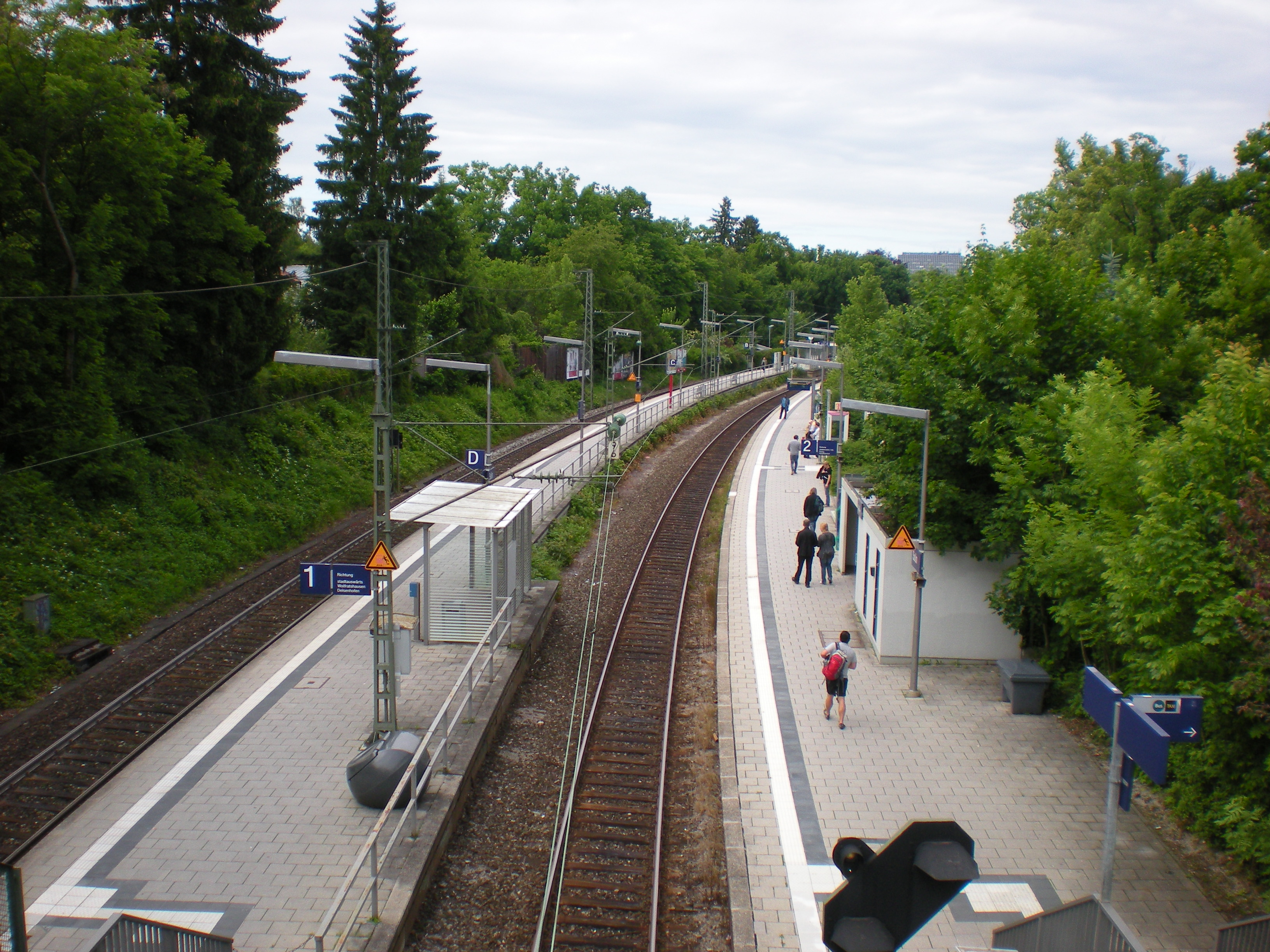
- 2012

General information
- Location: Bichler Straße 72; Thalkirchen-Obersendling-Forstenried-Fürstenried-Solln, Munich, Bavaria; Germany
- Coordinates: 48°4′48″N 11°31′37″E
- Owner: Deutsche Bahn
- Operator: DB Netz; DB Station&Service
- Lines: Munich–Holzkirchen (KBS 955 / 956); Munich-Wolfratshausen (KBS 999.7)
- Platforms: 2 side platforms
- Tracks: 2
- Train operators: Bayerische Oberlandbahn; Munich S-Bahn
- Connections: 134, 135, 136, 270

Other information
- Station code: 4269
- DS100 code: MSN
- IBNR: 8004161
- Category: 5
- Fare zone: : M and 1
- Website: www.bahnhof.de

Services
Preceding station		Following station
Munich Harras towards München Hbf	RB 55 Sa+Su	Holzkirchen towards Bayrischzell
Munich Harras towards München Hbf	RB 56 Sa+Su	Holzkirchen towards Lenggries
Munich Harras towards München Hbf	RB 57 Sa+Su	Holzkirchen towards Tegernsee
Munich Siemenswerke towards München Hbf	RB 58 Mo-Fr	Deisenhofen towards Rosenheim
Preceding station	Munich S-Bahn	Following station
Großhesselohe Isartalbahnhof towards Wolfratshausen	S7	Siemenswerke towards München Hbf
Großhesselohe Isartalbahnhof towards Höllriegelskreuth	S20	Siemenswerke towards Geltendorf
Location
- Location within Bavaria Location within Germany Location within Europe

Munich-Solln station is a Munich S-Bahn railway station on the Bayerische Oberlandbahn main line in the borough of Solln.

German businessman Dominik Brunner was murdered at this station on 12 September 2009 while trying to protect a group of young teenagers from a gang of thugs.
