= S20 (Munich) =

Overview
- Line number: S20
- Locale: Munich, Bavaria, Germany

Service
- System: Munich S-Bahn
- Route number: 999.20
- Operator: S-Bahn Munich
- Rolling stock: DB Class 420

Technical
- Electrification: 15 kV, 16.7 Hz AC Overhead lines

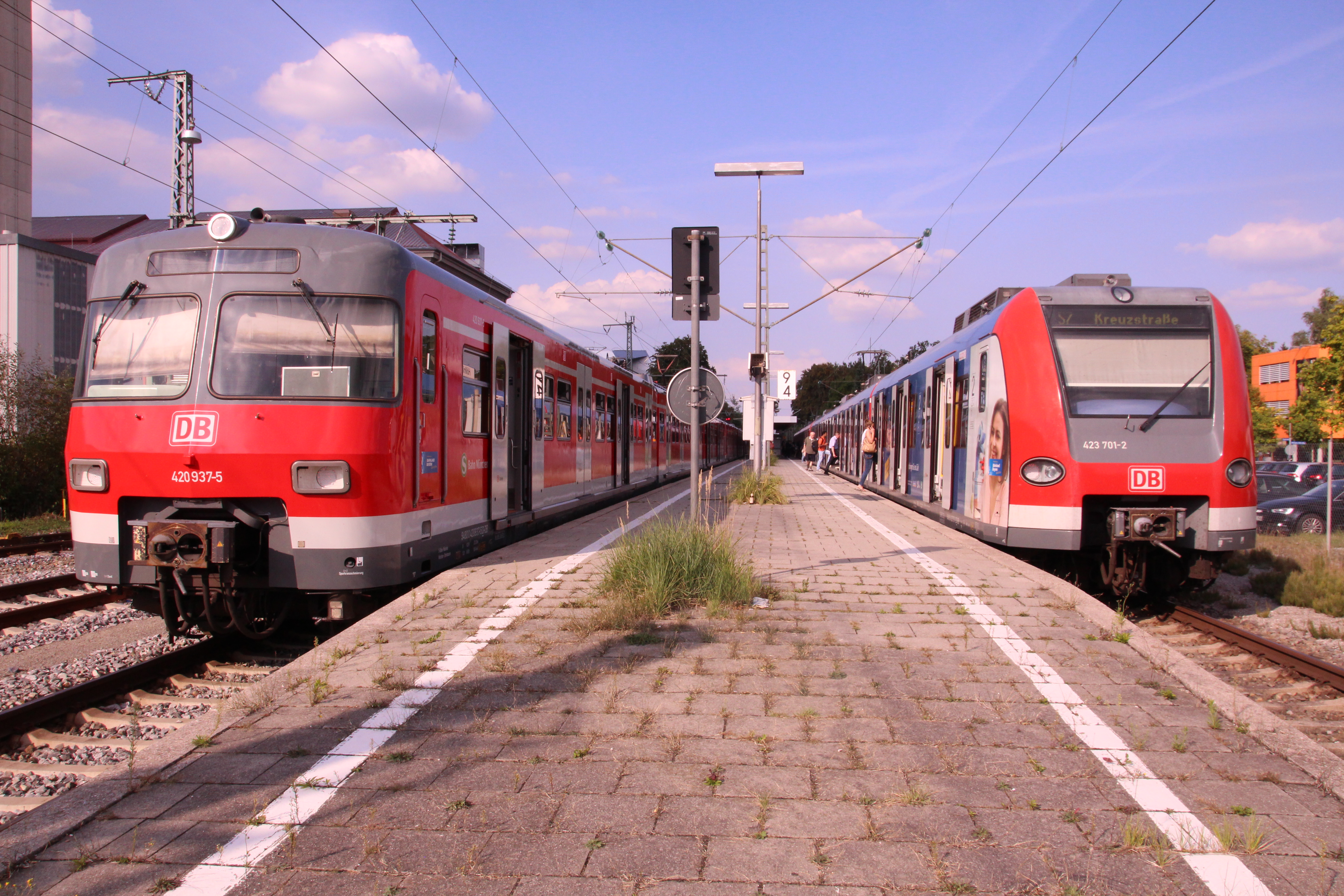
S20 train (left) at Höllriegelskreuth station

Line S20 is a line on the Munich S-Bahn network. It is operated by DB Regio Bayern. It runs from Munich-Pasing station to Höllriegelskreuth. It runs on a connecting line from Pasing to Munich-Mittersendling station that has a platform at Munich Heimeranplatz station, but does not have a platform at Munich Harras station, although the track here lies directly next to the Munich–Holzkirchen railway. It is operated during peak hours from Monday through Friday. It is operated using class 423 four-car electrical multiple units.

The line runs over lines built at various times:

- from Munich-Pasing station to east of Munich-Pasing station (where it has no platform) over a track running parallel with and to the south of the Munich–Augsburg railway, opened by the Munich–Augsburg Railway Company on 1 September 1839, known as the Sendlinger Spange (“Sendling clasp”); from München-Friedenheimer Brücke junction this track runs parallel with the Munich South Ring to Munich Heimeranplatz station
- from Munich Heimeranplatz station to a point to the north of Grosshesselohe Isartal station, its track runs parallel with the Munich–Holzkirchen railway, opened from Munich to Grosshesselohe on 24 June 1854 as part of the Bavarian Maximilian's Railway.
- from a point to the north of Grosshesselohe Isartal station to Höllriegelskreuth on the Isar Valley Railway, opened by the Lokalbahn AG company (LAG) on 27 July 1891 and electrified from Wolfratshausen to Höllriegelskreuth in May 1960 at 580 volts DC and converted to 15 kV AC on 27 September 1957

S-Bahn services commenced on 28 May 1972 as S-Bahn line 12. It ran to Deisenhofen rather than Höllriegelskreuth until 14 December 2013.
