= Munich Heimeranplatz station =

Munich railway station

München Heimeranplatz
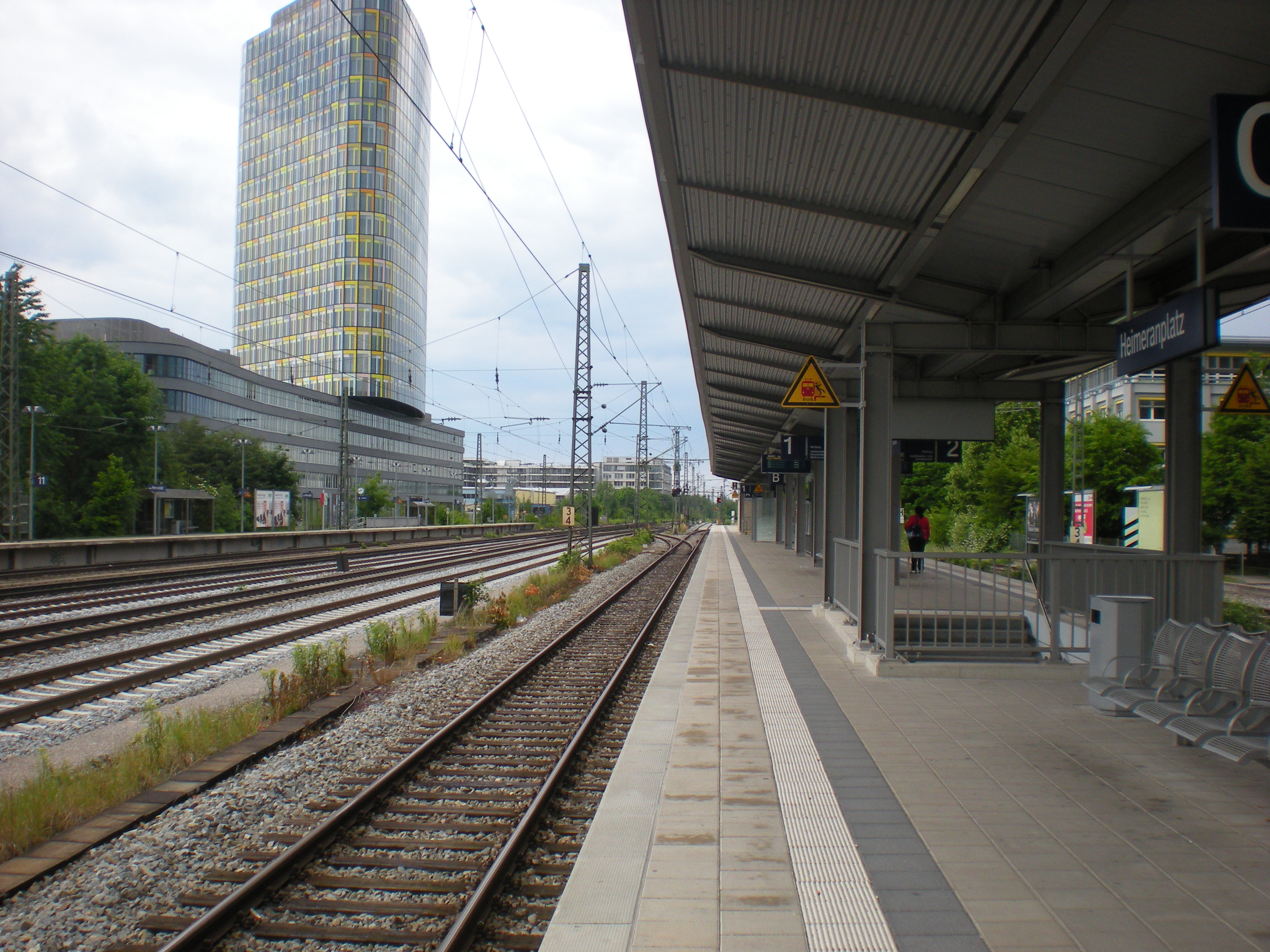

General information
- Location: Garmischer Str., Schwanthalerhöhe, Munich, Bavaria; Germany
- Coordinates: 48°8′0″N 11°32′1″E
- Lines: Munich–Holzkirchen (KBS 955 / 956): U-Bahn lines and
- Platforms: S-Bahn: 3; U-Bahn: 2
- Connections: 130, 157, N43, N44

Construction
- Accessible: Yes

Other information
- Station code: 4235
- DS100 code: MHP
- IBNR: 8005419
- Category: 4
- Fare zone: : M
- Website: BEG; www.bahnhof.de

History
- Opened: 1984

Services
Preceding station		Following station
Munich Harras towards Rosenheim	RB 58 Mo-Fr	Munich Donnersbergerbrücke towards München Hbf
Preceding station	Munich S-Bahn	Following station
Harras towards Wolfratshausen	S7	Donnersbergerbrücke towards München Hbf
Pasing towards Geltendorf	S20	Mittersendling towards Höllriegelskreuth
Preceding station	Munich U-Bahn	Following station
Westendstraße Terminus	U4	Schwanthalerhöhe towards Arabellapark
Westendstraße towards Laimer Platz	U5	Schwanthalerhöhe towards Neuperlach Süd
Location

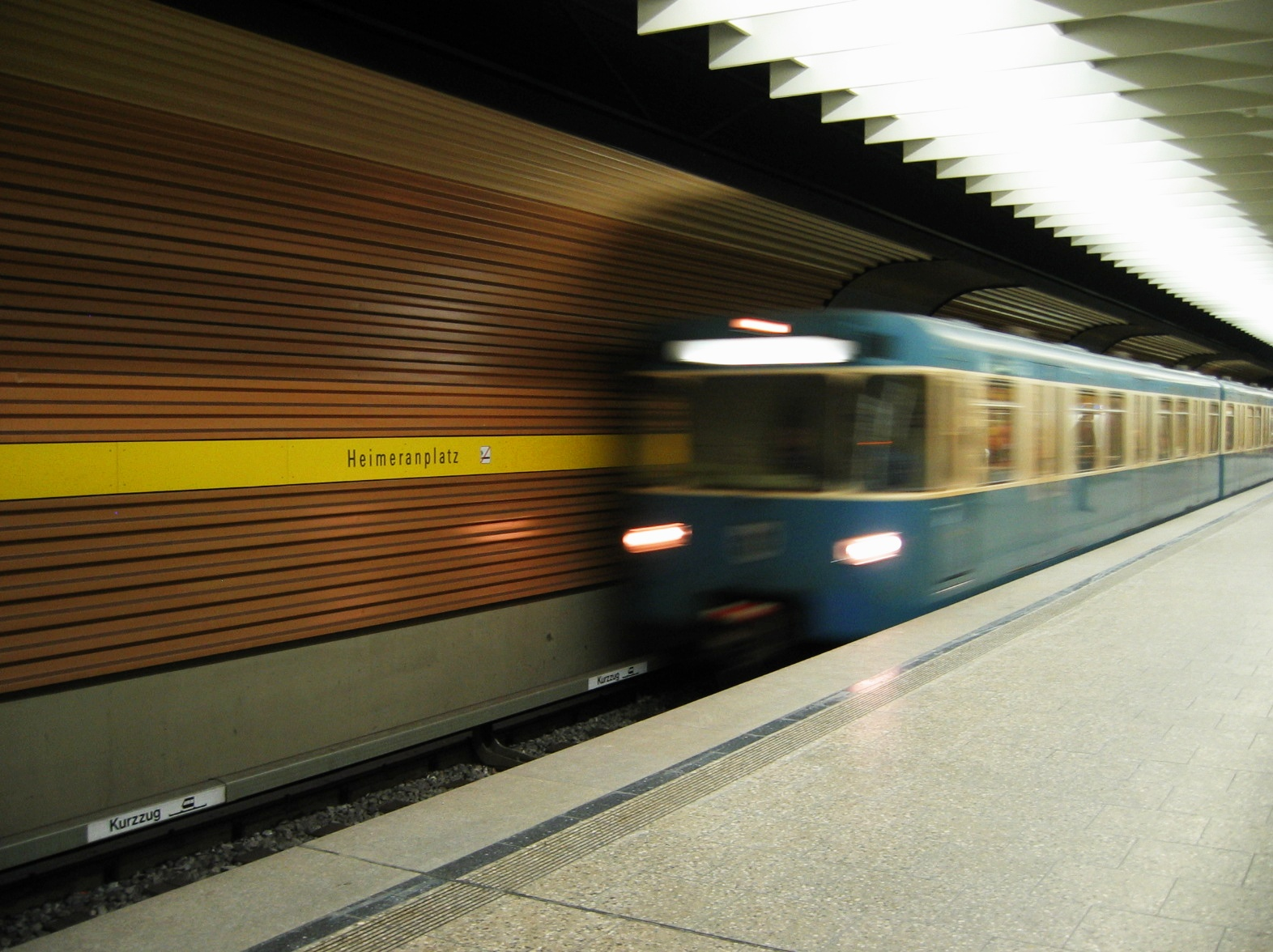
U-Bahn station

Munich Heimeranplatz is a railway station in Munich, the state capital of Bavaria, Germany. It sits on the border of two Munich boroughs, Laim and Schwanthalerhöhe. It serves as a transportation hub for the Westend and eastern Laim, offering transfer between S-Bahn, U-Bahn, local bus services as well as limited regional railway services on the Bayerische Oberlandbahn main line.

The subway runs in a tunnel in a roughly east–west direction, while the S-Bahn's two platforms – a middle platform for the S7 service and a single-side platform for the S20 – are situated on an elevated level on an overpass on the Garmischer Straße stretch of Munich's central ring road, the Mittlerer Ring. In the northern direction, the S-Bahn tracks split, with S20 continuing west towards Pasing and S7 continuing east towards Donnersbergerbrücke. The S-Bahn station is located to the west of the subway station, necessitating a short walk alongside an elevated sidewalk.

== Name ==
The station is named after the adjacent Heimeranplatz, a major traffic intersection, north-east of the station. The intersection, in turn, is named after Ernst Heimeran, a Munich author and publisher. The Mittlerer Ring orbital road passes under Heimeranplatz, in a stretch called the Trappentreu tunnel, Munich's first tunnel on the ring road.

== Notable places nearby ==
- Bavariapark
- Westpark
- Theresienwiese
- Rudi-Sedlmayer-Halle (BMW Park)
