= Munich Harras station =

Munich railway station

München Harras
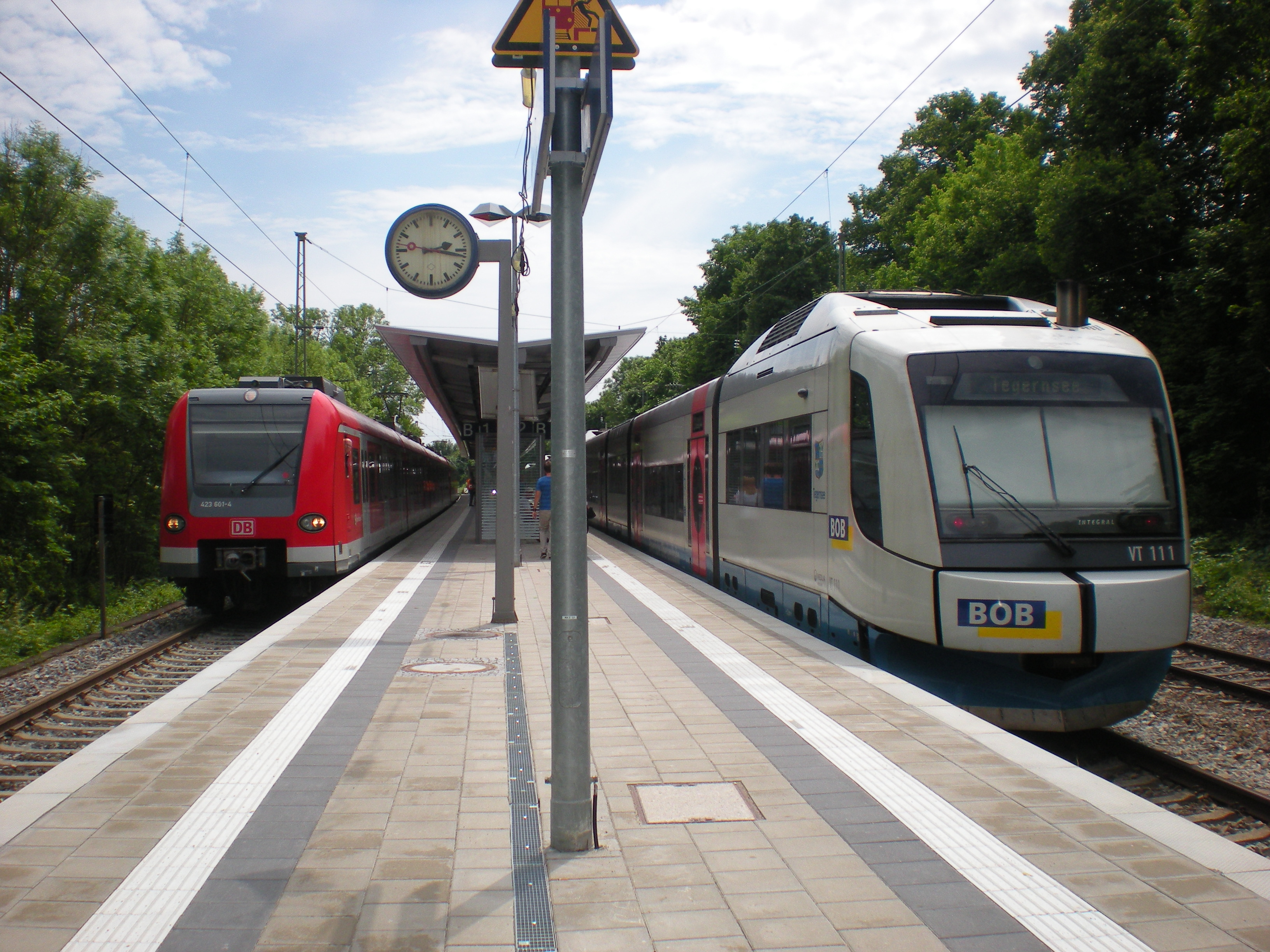

General information
- Location: Sendling, Munich, Bavaria; Germany
- Coordinates: 48°7′1″N 11°32′13″E
- Lines: Munich–Holzkirchen (KBS 955 / 956); U-Bahn line
- Platforms: S-Bahn: 2; U-Bahn: 2
- Connections: 130, 132, 134, 153, 157, N40, N41, N43, N44, X30

Other information
- Station code: n/a
- DS100 code: MHAR
- Category: 4
- Fare zone: : M
- Website: www.bahnhof.de

Services
Preceding station		Following station
Munich Solln weekends towards Schliersee or Bayrischzell	RB 55	Donnersbergerbrücke towards München Hbf
Munich Siemenswerke weekdays towards Schliersee or Bayrischzell	RB 55	Donnersbergerbrücke towards München Hbf
Munich Siemenswerke weekdays towards Lenggries	RB 56	Donnersbergerbrücke towards München Hbf
Munich Solln weekends towards Lenggries	RB 56	Donnersbergerbrücke towards München Hbf
Munich Siemenswerke weekdays towards Tegernsee	RB 57	Donnersbergerbrücke towards München Hbf
Munich Solln weekends towards Tegernsee	RB 57	Donnersbergerbrücke towards München Hbf
Terminus	RB 58	Munich Heimeranplatz towards München Hbf
Munich Mittersendling towards München Hbf	RB 58 weekdays	Terminus
Preceding station	Munich S-Bahn	Following station
Mittersendling towards Wolfratshausen	S7	Heimeranplatz towards München Hbf
Preceding station	Munich U-Bahn	Following station
Partnachplatz towards Klinikum Großhadern	U6	Implerstraße towards Garching-Forschungszentrum
Location
- Location within Bavaria Location within Germany Location within Europe

Munich Harras is a railway station in Munich, the state capital of Bavaria, Germany. It is located in the Harras area of the borough of Sendling. It serves as an important transportation hub for the borough, providing interchange between S-Bahn, U-Bahn, local bus services as well as limited regional railway services on the Bayerische Oberlandbahn main line. The S-Bahn station is located down the road from the U-Bahn station, necessitating a short walk along Albert-Roßhaupter-Straße. Both the U-Bahn station and the S-Bahn station have access for disabled people.

== Name ==
The station is named after a large road intersection, Am Harras, where Albert-Roßhaupter-Straße (east-west) and Plinganserstraße (north-south) meet. Before the rise of local buses, Am Harras used to be an important tramway interchange station, servicing lines 6 and 8. Evidence of this can still be found, as many of the tramway lanes have been converted to bus lanes. Plinganserstraße, running south from Harras, boasts a large green patch dividing the north-south lanes, where the former tramway used to run.

== Nearby places of interest ==
- Sendling Church
- Am Harras
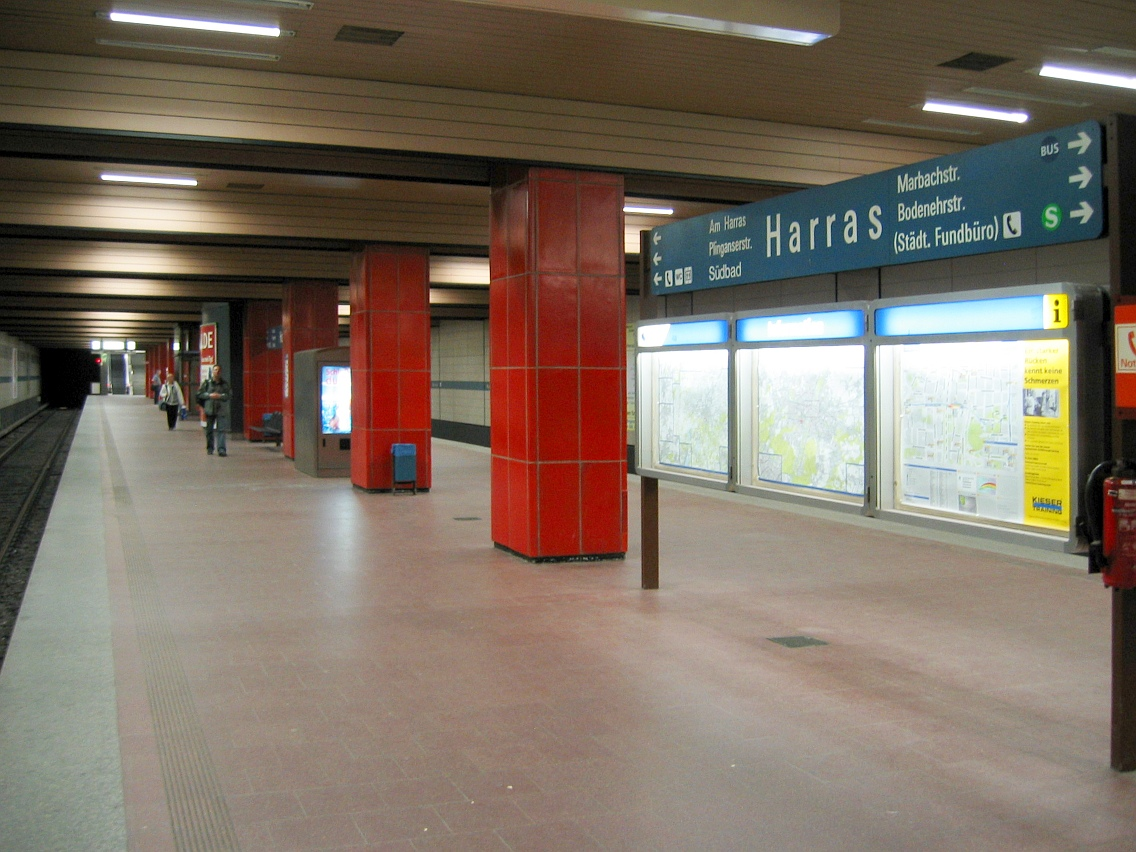
Harras U-Bahn station
