= Holzkirchen, Upper Bavaria =

Holzkirchen
- Municipality
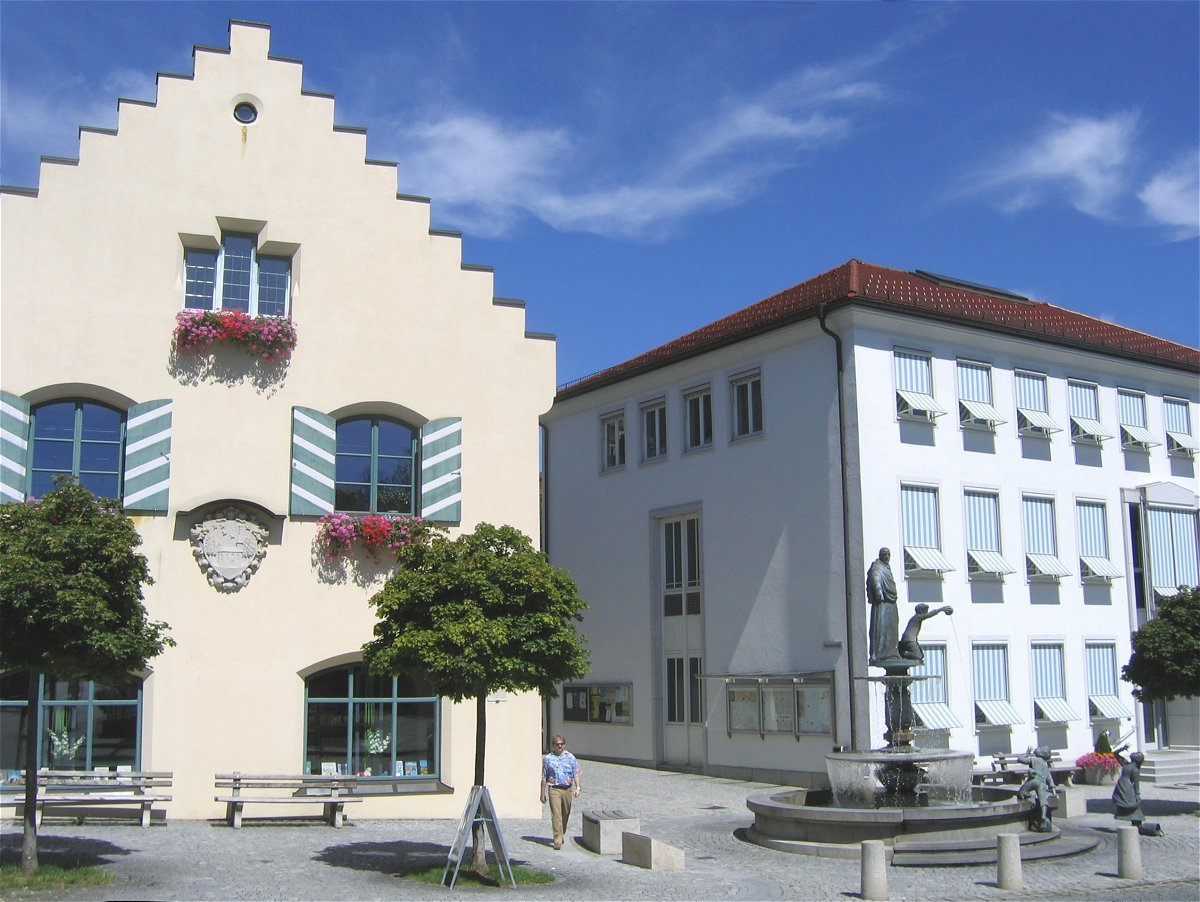
- Old and new town halls

- Coat of arms

- Location of Holzkirchen within Miesbach district
- Interactive map of Holzkirchen
- Location within Germany Location within Bavaria
- Coordinates: 47°53′N 11°42′E
- Country: Germany
- State: Bavaria
- Admin. region: Oberbayern
- District: Miesbach
- Subdivisions: 35 Ortsteile

Government
  - Mayor (2020–26): Christoph Schmid (CSU)

Area
  - Total: 48.24 km^{2} (18.63 sq mi)
- Elevation: 691 m (2,267 ft)

Population (2025-12-31)
  - Total: 16,187
  - Density: 335.6/km^{2} (869.1/sq mi)
- Time zone: UTC+01:00 (CET)
  - Summer (DST): UTC+02:00 (CEST)
- Postal codes: 83607
- Dialling codes: 08024
- Vehicle registration: MB
- Website: www.holzkirchen.de

Holzkirchen (German pronunciation: [ˈhɔltsˌkɪʁçn̩]) is a market town in Bavaria, Germany. With a population of over 16,000 (2008) it is the largest town in the Miesbach district.

Holzkirchen is located on the Alpenvorland in the county of Miesbach.

== History ==
Holzkirchen was established as a Markt in the 13th century.

Holzkirchen was the location of one of the main transmitting stations for Radio Free Europe. Transmissions started in 1951 and provided the people of Eastern Europe with news from Western Europe. The transmitters had a strength of up to 135 Kilowatts and was upgraded to 150 Kilowatts in 1967. The relay transmitters were decommissioned in 1990. Final decommissioning of the Holzkirchen array was in 2004. There were claims that the high-powered transmissions caused illnesses locally. There were also claims that it was so strong that locals could hear the radio programmes through their faucets. Subsequent to the relocation of RFE studios from Munich to Prague, the medium wave transmitter was shut down in 2001, following which the short wave transmissions continued on reduced power. The final transmissions were made in 2005, after which the transmission equipment was packed up to be sent to the Philippines and the masts were scrapped.

Nowadays Holzkirchen is well known as a location for pharmaceutical research and production. The European center of Sandoz and HEXAL are located in the industrial zone.

== Public transport ==
=== Trains ===
The traffic hub Holzkirchen has with the railway line Munich–Holzkirchen and the railway line Munich East–Deisenhofen a good connection to Munich (including an S-Bahn connection (S3), which departs every 20 minutes). The Railway Line Holzkirchen–Lenggries (German) and the connection towards Schliersee are operated once an hour by the Bayerischen Oberlandbahn (BOB) and give direct connections to Tegernsee, Lenggries und Bayrischzell. On the railway line called Mangfallbahn to Rosenheim, services have been operated once an hour since December 2013 by the company called 'Meridian', which is a subsidiary of Transdev Germany (before Meridian, the railway line was operated by the DB Regio AG) via Bad Aibling. Mondays to Fridays Meridian operates nine services, which connect Rosenheim and Munich Central Station via Holzkirchen.

S-Bahn

Mammendorf – Malching – Maisach – Gernlinden – Esting – Olching – Gröbenzell – Lochhausen – Langwied – Pasing – Laim – Hirschgarten – Donnersbergerbrücke – Hackerbrücke – Munich Central Station – Karlsplatz (Stachus) – Marienplatz – Isartor – Rosenheimer Platz – Munich East – St.-Martin-Straße – Giesing – Fasangarten – Fasanenpark – Unterhaching – Taufkirchen – Furth – Deisenhofen – Sauerlach – Otterfing – Holzkirchen	Every 20 Minutes

=== Buses ===
The following routes of the Oberbayernbus and the MVV Buses stop at the station or at the Zentraler Omnibus-Bahnhof (ZOB).

Line	Operator	Route
9001	Oberbayernbus	Holzkirchen local traffic, Lines 1–6
9553	Oberbayernbus	Holzkirchen (Oberbayern) – Sachsenkam – Schaftlach – Waakirchen – Reichersbeuern – Bad Tölz – Obergries – Lenggries
9561	Oberbayernbus	Holzkirchen (Oberbayern) – Valley – Weyarn – Miesbach – Hausham – Schliersee
9566	Oberbayernbus	Holzkirchen (Oberbayern) – Warngau – Gmund am Tegernsee – Tegernsee
9567	Oberbayernbus	Holzkirchen (Oberbayern) – Warngau – Miesbach
9568	Oberbayernbus	Holzkirchen (Oberbayern) – Otterfing – Dietramszell – Bad Tölz
