= Munich–Holzkirchen railway =

Munich–Holzkirchen Railway

Overview
- Line number: 5505
- Locale: Bavaria, Germany

Service
- Route number: 955, 956, 999.3, 999.20

Technical
- Line length: 35.5 km (22.1 mi)
- Track gauge: 1,435 mm (4 ft 8 1/2 in) standard gauge
- Electrification: 15 kV/16.7 Hz AC overhead catenary

The Munich–Holzkirchen railway is a continuously-electrified, double-track, railway in the German state of Bavaria. It runs from Munich to Holzkirchen via Deisenhofen.

== History ==
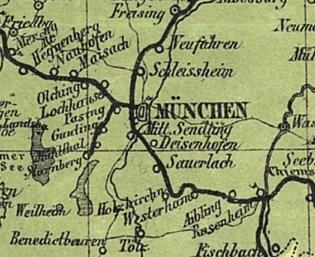
The routes of important railways in Munich in 1861

The Munich–Holzkirchen line was built as a part of the Bavarian Maximilian's Railway along with the Munich-Rosenheim section of the modern Mangfall Valley Railway. The section between Munich and Rosenheim was designed between 1840 and 1850. The first section from Munich to Hesselohe was built from 1845. The continuation to Rosenheim was originally proposed to go via Glonn and Kirchdorf am Haunpold. After it was approved in 1850, the line was finally built via Holzkirchen. This route modified the plans of 1850 by Joseph Anton von Maffei for the Munich-Rosenheim-Salzburg Railway Company (München-Rosenheim-Salzburger-Eisenbahn-Verein) in order to run closer to the Miesbach coalfields. Construction of the Großhesselohe Bridge began in 1851. When it was opened it was the second highest railway bridge in the world. In 1852, the Bavarian State became responsible for its funding, because the company had got into financial difficulties. The line was completed all the way to Rosenheim in 1857. With the opening of the shorter Munich–Rosenheim railway via Grafing in 1871, the line had less traffic. In 1891, the line was crossed by the Isar Valley Railway that paralleled the Isar river. In 1968 the line was electrified. In 1981, Großhesselohe station was closed, after several renovations, as the Isar Valley Railway with its Grosshesselohe Isartal station had been fully integrated in the Munich S-Bahn network.

The railway is now integrated the Munich S-Bahn network. It is also served by trains of the Bayerische Oberlandbahn (BOB).

== Route ==
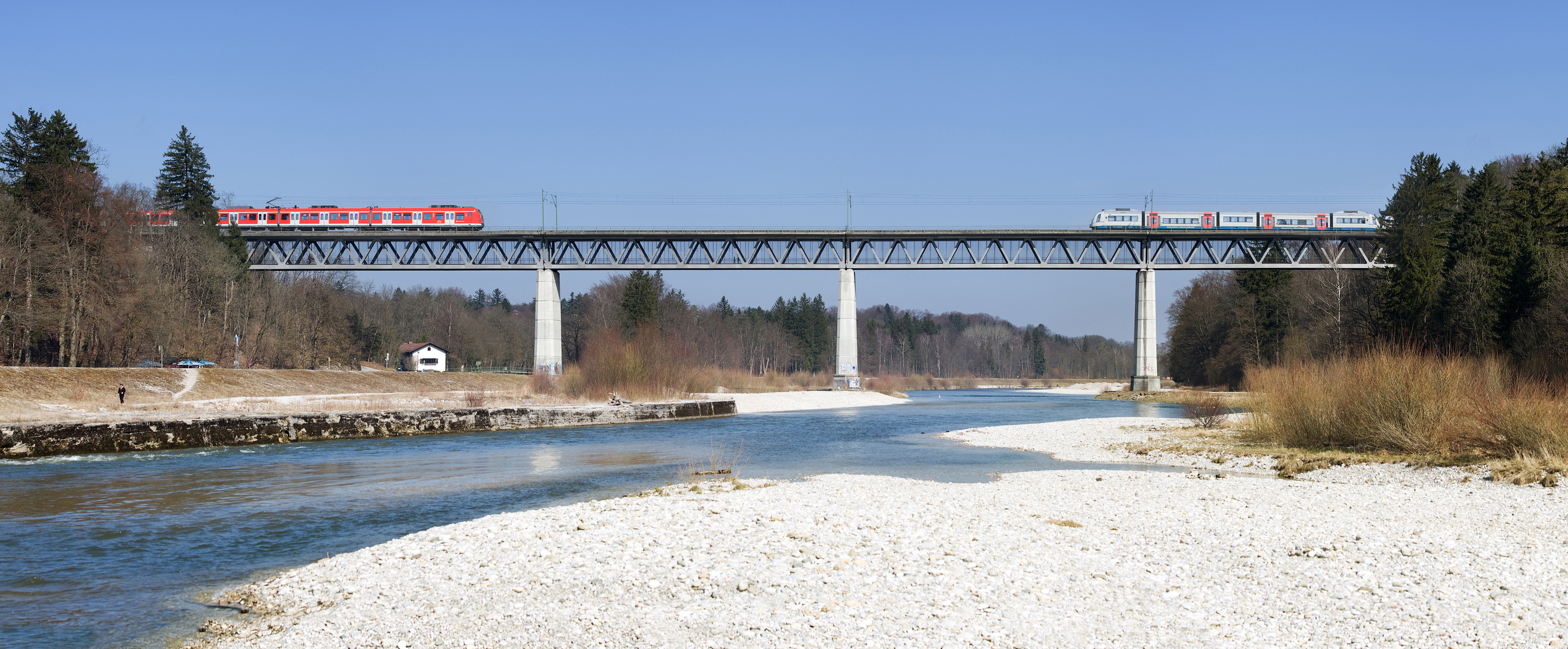
The new Großhesselohe Bridge with a train of the Bayerische Oberlandbahn towards Munich Central Station (right) and a S 27 service towards Deisenhofen (left)

The line leaves Munich Central Station (Hauptbahnhof) to the west along the S-Bahn route. Before München Donnersbergerbrücke station the track leading out of the city runs on a fly-over above the track of the S-Bahn trunk route running into the city so that trains running in the same direction can have cross platform transfers at Donnersbergerbrücke station. Immediately after Donnersbergerbrücke station the tracks go underground and pass under both the lines running to the west from the Hauptbahnhof and the link from the Hauptbahnhof to Munich East station (South Ring), which it then follows. After Heimeranplatz the line turns away from the South Ring and runs in a southerly direction where it forms the boundary between the districts of Sendling and Sendling-Westpark. Between the stations of Harras and Mittersendling it connects with the rail link from München-Pasing, which has been running west of the line since Heimeranplatz. Then it reaches the borough of Thalkirchen-Obersendling-Forstenried-Fürstenried-Solln. After Solln station there is now a junction with the line to Wolfratshausen. It is the southern branch of the Isar Valley Railway, which originally crossed over the Maximilian's Railway here without a connection. The northern section of the Isar Valley Railway has been abandoned. The Holzkirchen line now runs eastwards, crossing the Isar over the Großhesselohe bridge and running through the Perlacher Forest. In Deisenhofen it meets the Munich East–Deisenhofen railway. Until the next station at Sauerlach the line runs again in a south-easterly direction through a wooded area and then turns again to the south along the west side of the Hofolding Forest through Otterfing and shortly afterwards reaches Holzkirchen.

== Operations ==
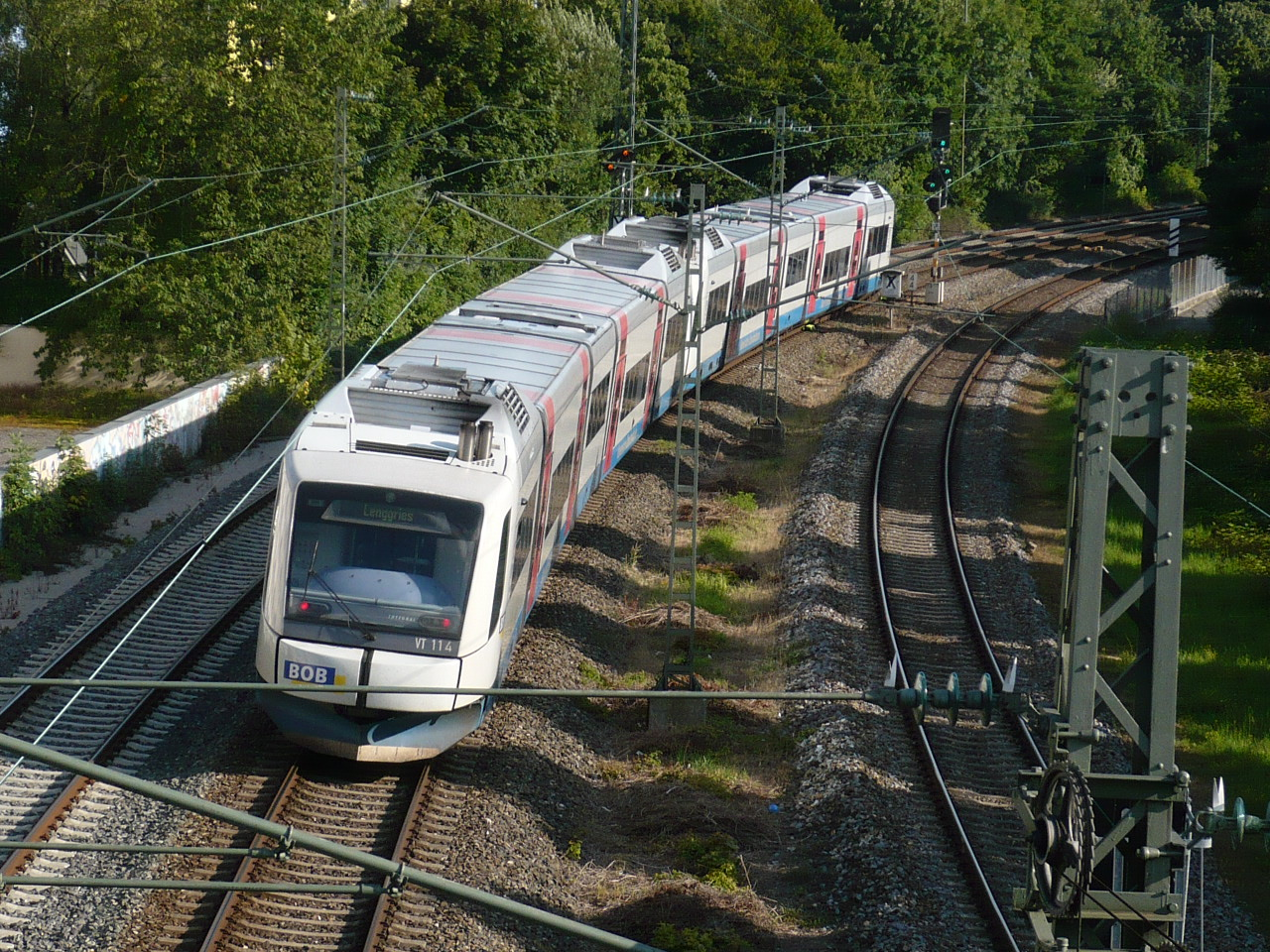
Integral train of the Bayrische Oberlandbahn running towards Harras and Heimeranplatz

S7 services of the Munich S-Bahn run on the route from the S-Bahn trunk line coming from Donnersbergerbrücke to Solln and then branch off on the former Isar Valley Railway towards Wolfratshausen. Both lines serve all stops. Coming from Pasing, S20 also runs to Deisenhofen. The connecting line from Pasing has a platform at Heimeranplatz but not at Harras, although the track here lies directly next to the Munich–Holzkirchen line. The section of the line between Holzkirchen and Deisenhofen is served by S3, which runs from Deisenhofen via the Munich East–Deisenhofen railway towards the inner city.

Bayerische Oberlandbahn (BOB) services run along the entire length of the line. The BOB trains do not stop at all stops, some are only served on certain days. BOB trains run from Holzkirchen towards Bayrischzell, Tegernsee and Lenggries. BOB trains also run from Munich to Holzkirchen and continuing via the Mangfall Valley Railway to Rosenheim.
