= Deisenhofen station =

Munich S-Bahn station

Deisenhofen
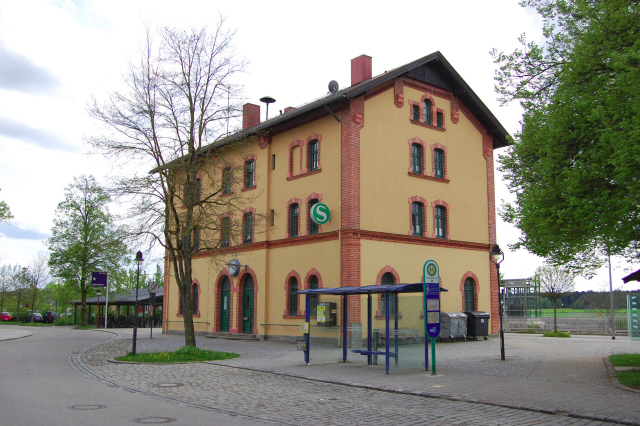

General information
- Location: Bahnhofsplatz 1, Oberhaching, Deisenhofen, Bavaria; Germany
- Coordinates: 48°01′10″N 11°35′01″E
- Owner: Deutsche Bahn
- Operator: DB Netz; DB Station&Service
- Lines: Munich Hbf–Holzkirchen (km 18.4); Munich East–Deisenhofen (km 13.1)
- Platforms: 4
- Connections: 222, 224, 226, 227, 371, 2100, X203, X320

Construction
- Accessible: Yes

Other information
- Station code: 1153
- DS100 code: MDS
- IBNR: 8001404
- Category: 4
- Fare zone: : M and 1
- Website: www.bahnhof.de; stationsdatenbank.de

History
- Opened: 1862

Services
Preceding station		Following station
Munich-Solln towards München Hbf	RB 58 Monday until Friday only	Holzkirchen towards Rosenheim
Preceding station	Munich S-Bahn	Following station
Furth (b Deisenhofen) towards Mammendorf	S3	Sauerlach towards Holzkirchen
Location
- Location within Bavaria Location within Germany Location within Europe

Deisenhofen is a Munich S-Bahn railway station in Deisenhofen, a district of Oberhaching.

== History ==
Deisenhofen station was opened in 1862 on the Munich–Holzkirchen section of the Bavarian Maximilian Railway. Since 10 October 1898 there has also been a connection to Munich East station, the Munich East–Deisenhofen railway. Since 1972, the station has been integrated in the network of the Munich S-Bahn.

In 2004 the station was made fully accessible. The platforms were raised and modernised and the station building was renovated. New park-and-ride and bicycle storage facilities were built near the station. The bus stop in the station forecourt was also modernised, with a new turning circle for buses built on the forecourt. The costs involved were met by Deutsche Bahn AG and the Oberhaching municipality.

The station building, a three-story stucco building with subdivisions formed of rich bricks, which was built around 1875, is protected as a monument. Deutsche Bahn unsuccessfully offered the station building for sale in 2009. In 2013 the Oberhaching municipality suggested that a cafe with toilets accessible by the public might be established in the station building, with private apartments on the first and second floors.

After the municipality of Oberhaching purchased the station building in 2014, a complete renovation and refurbishment of the building took place from 2024 to March 2026. The "3sine" restaurant opened in March 2026; event spaces, guest rooms, and living quarters for staff are also available.

== Infrastructure ==
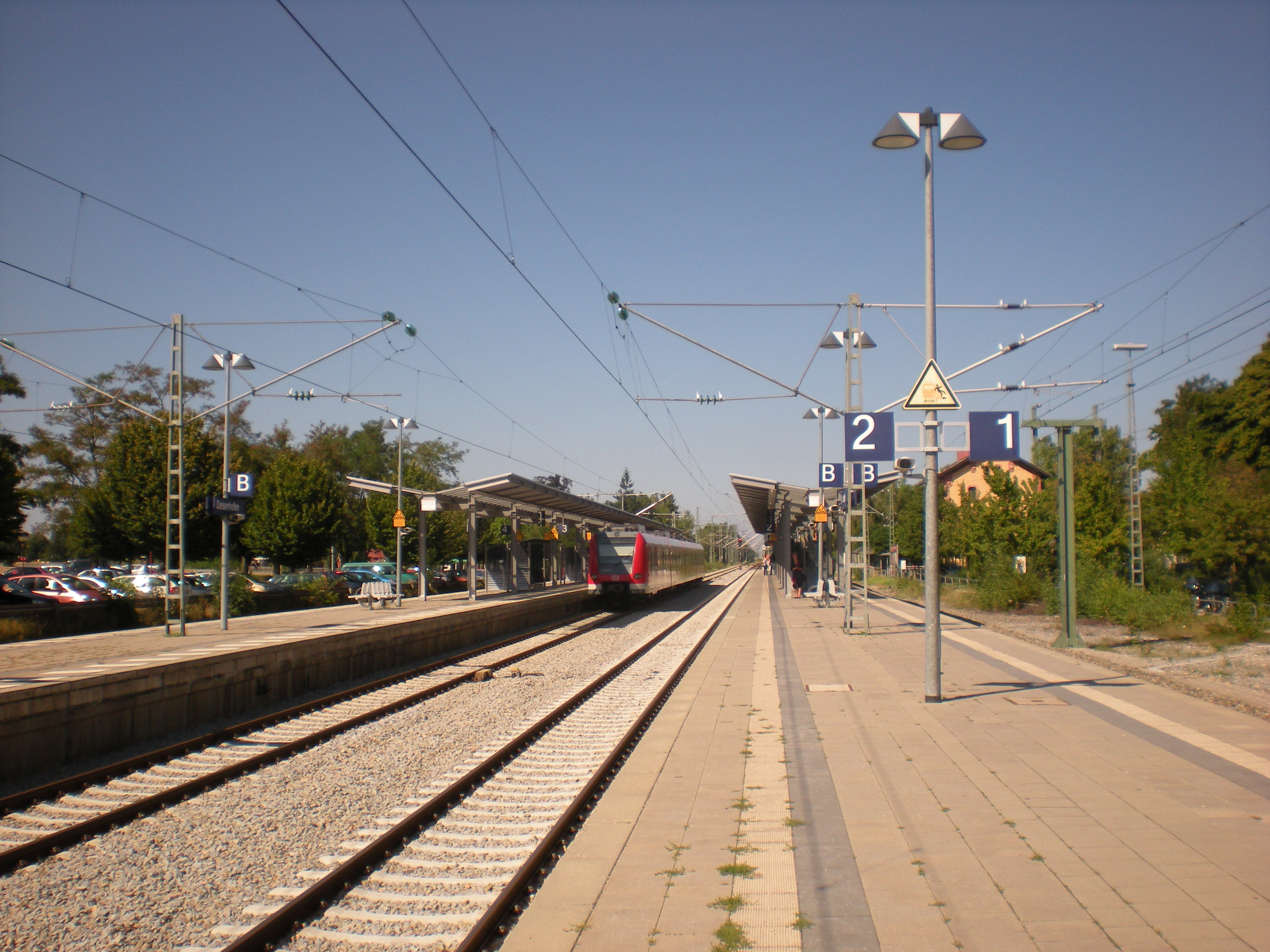
Platforms

The station has four platform tracks around two central platforms. S-Bahn line S 3 services stops on track 1 towards Munich East, while services towards Holzkirchen stop on track 2. Track 3 is used by the trains on lines S 20 and S 27 coming from Solln and returning there, while track 4 is not used for schedules services any more. Both platforms are covered and have digital destination displays. The platforms are connected by a tunnel to the station forecourt and equipped with lifts to make them accessible for the disabled.

The station is located in the service area of the Münchner Verkehrs- und Tarifverbund (Munich Transport and Tariff Association, MVV).

=== Platform data ===
Platform lengths and heights are as follows:

- Track 1: length 216 m, height 96 cm
- Track 2: length 216 m, height 96 cm
- Track 3: length 237 m, height 96 cm
- Track 4: length 237 m, height 96 cm

== Transport services ==
Deisenhofen Station is on line S 3 of the Munich S-Bahn, which operates at 20-minute intervals. From Monday to Friday the station is also served by hourly services of the RB 58 on the route from Munich Hauptbahnhof via Holzkirchen to Rosenheim, operated by the Bayerische Regiobahn.
