= Bayerische Oberlandbahn =

Private railway company in Germany

Bayerische Oberlandbahn GmbH

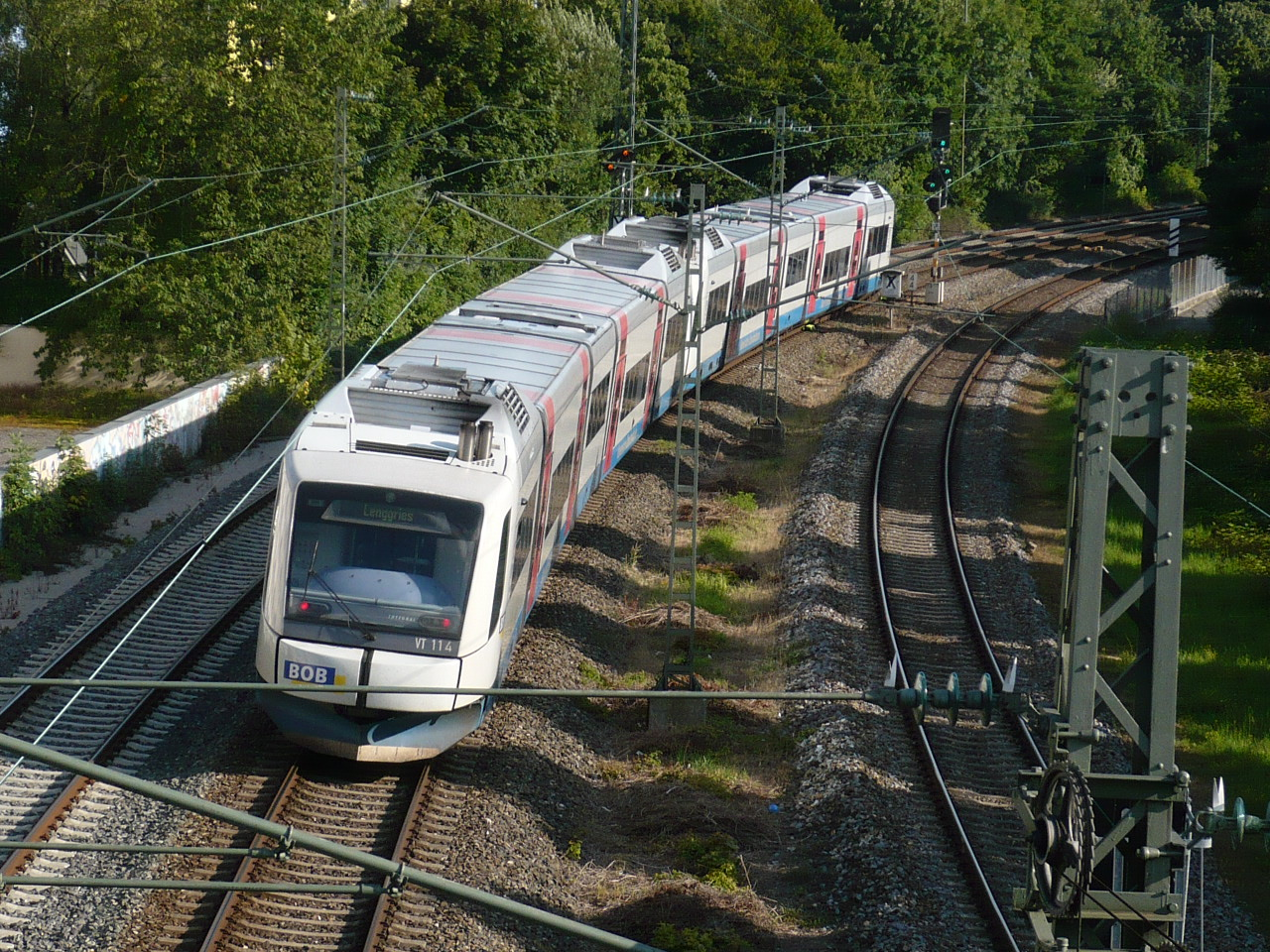
- Integral between Harras and Heimeranplatz

Overview
- Headquarters: Holzkirchen
- Locale: Bavaria, Germany
- Dates of operation: 1998–

Technical
- Track gauge: 1,435 mm (4 ft 8 1/2 in) standard gauge

Other
- Website: www.brb.de

The Bayerische Oberlandbahn GmbH (BOB) is a private railway company based in Holzkirchen, Germany, and owned by Transdev Germany (formerly known as Veolia Verkehr). Since June 2020 its services are operated under the brand Bayerische Regiobahn (BRB) of its sister company.

BOB Trains connect Munich with the alpine hamlets of Bayrischzell, Lenggries, and the spa town of Tegernsee. The routes are not electrified and are serviced with diesel-hydraulic and diesel-mechanic DMUs.

== Lines served ==
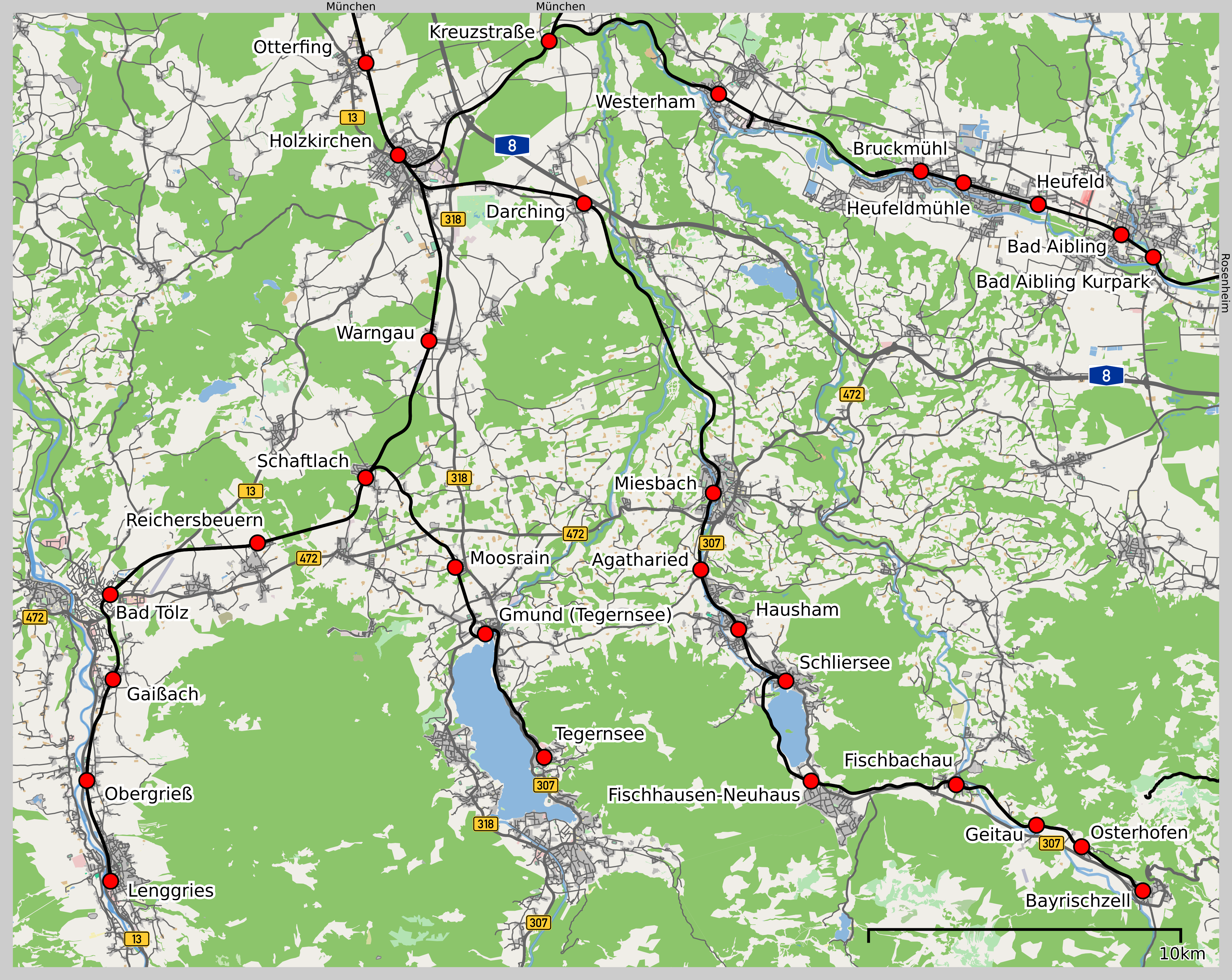
The routes served by the BOB south of Holzkirchen.

The three BOB lines run on part of what was the Bayerischen Maximiliansbahn as a combined train set from München Hauptbahnhof via the southern ring to Holzkirchen. In Holzkirchen, one of the DMUs splits off of the train, heading off to the east, running through Miesbach and Schliersee to Bayrischzell. The two remaining DMU continue on to Schaftlach where they separate again, with one DMU going to Lenggries via Bad Tölz, while the last DMU heads off towards the southeast to Tegernsee. The Tegernsee Line makes use of the tracks owned by the Tegernsee-Bahn, a private rail infrastructure provider.

The separate DMUs travel from München Hauptbahnhof to Holzkirchen or Schaftlach as a single train. They then split up and travel on to their individual destinations. On the return trip to Munich, the individual units are connected again and run as a single train back to München Hauptbahnhof. Between Holzkirchen and Munich BOB Trains run under the Münchner Verkehrs- und Tarifverbund tariff system.

The Bayerische Oberland Bahn GmbH is a member of the "Tarifverband der Bundeseigenen und Nichtbundeseigenen Eisenbahnen in Deutschland" (TBNE: Tariff Association of federally and non-federally owned railways in Germany).

== History ==
BOB was founded on 31 March 1998 and began service the same year. The company was launched to create more competition on the rail systems of southern Bavaria.

In the early days of service BOB trains were often plagued by technical problems with the new/untested Integral train set. These initial problems have since been resolved and BOB is now considered very reliable.

Since the beginning of July 2004 BOB has added three Bombardier Talent Train-sets to cover rush hour service.

BOB also operates on some DB electric lines using FLIRT3 electric multiple units from Stadler Rail. Between December 2013 and June 2020 these services were operated under the Meridian brand name.

On June 8, 2015, Bayerische Oberlandbahn GmbH was awarded the contract by the Verkehrsverbund Mittelsachsen (VMS) to operate the so-called E-Net Mittelsachsen from June 2016 to December 2030. The "Mitteldeutsche Regiobahn" brand of the sister company Transdev Regio Ost, based in Leipzig, is used for this purpose. Bayerische Oberlandbahn GmbH acts as the operating railway company in this contract. The vehicles used, of the type Alstom Coradia Continental, and the workshop in Chemnitz are owned by VMS, and the personnel are provided by Transdev Mitteldeutschland GmbH.

On February 9, 2016, two Meridian trains of Bayerische Oberlandbahn GmbH, carrying around 150 passengers, collided head-on on the Mangfalltalbahn between Bad Aibling and Kolbermoor. In the rail accident, the most severe in Bavaria since 1975, 12 people lost their lives. 85 were injured, 24 of them seriously.

In 2020, the aging Talent and Integral type railcars were gradually replaced by brand new diesel vehicles of the type "Alstom Coradia LINT54". With the timetable change for 2020/2021, Bayerische Oberlandbahn GmbH received six additional vehicles of this type for the Oberland, financed by BEG, enabling service enhancements and additional connections to meet the increasing passenger volume.

== Accidents and incidents ==
On 9 February 2016, two Stadler FLIRTs were involved in a head-on collision near Bad Aibling. Several people were killed and approximately 100 were injured.

== Timetable ==
BOB Lines are serviced at hourly/bi-hourly intervals, and with extra trains during rush hour. However, since December 2004 every other train/direction has had an increased journey time of 12 to 14 minutes, which contradicts the basic idea of a clock-face schedule.

== Utilization ==
BOB connections are not only highly used during weekdays, but also on the weekend by tourist and locals planning excursions to the Bavarian Alps, with walking, bike riding and skiing being favorite activities. Either a Bayern Ticket from Deutsche Bahn or a BOB weekend pass may be purchased for up to five passengers at a significantly discounted fare. Bus connections are available in Lenggries and Tegernsee to Karwendel, Achensee, Rofan and the Ski slopes on Wendelstein Sudelfeld, and Brauneck.

== Gallery ==
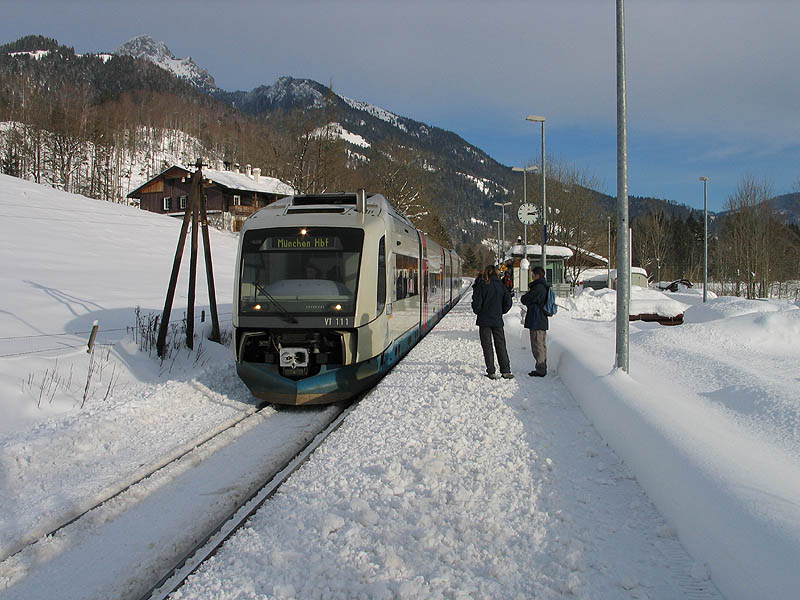
Integral at Geitau Station

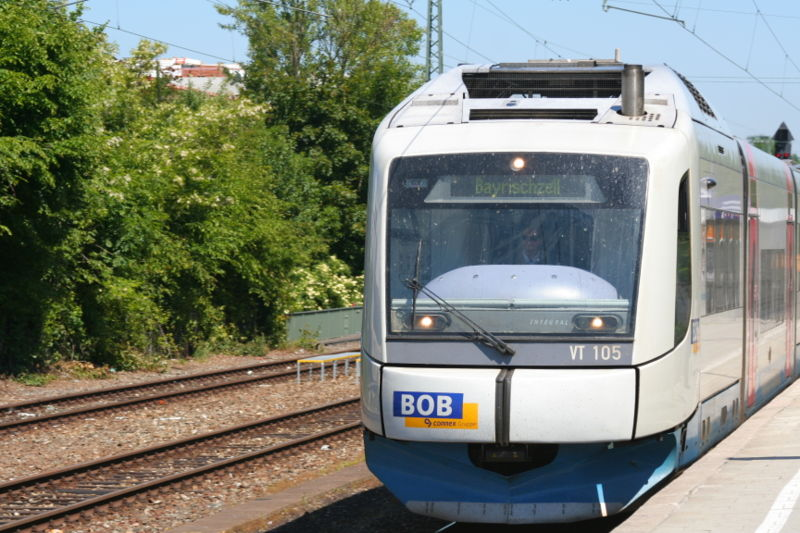
Integral at Mittersendling Station
