= Schaftlach station =

Railway station in Waakirchen, Germany

Schaftlach
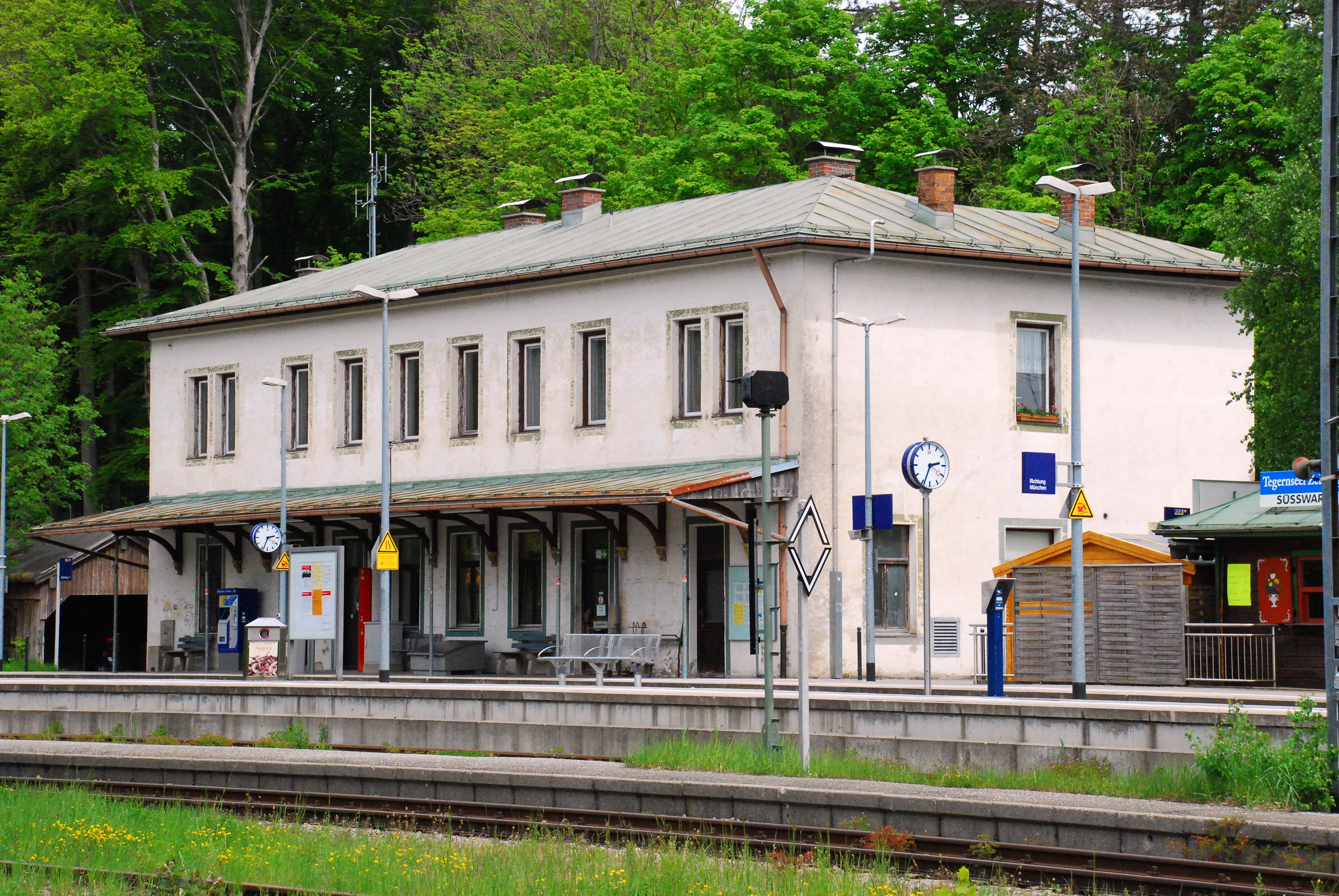
- Station building

General information
- Location: Schaftlach, Bavaria; Germany
- Coordinates: 47°47′43″N 11°41′03″E
- System: Separation station
- Owner: Deutsche Bahn
- Operator: DB Station&Service
- Lines: Holzkirchen–Lenggries; Schaftlach–Tegernsee
- Platforms: 3

Other information
- Station code: MSFL
- Website: www.bahnhof.de; stationsdatenbank.de

History
- Opened: 1 June 1874

Services
| Preceding station | | Following station |
|---|---|---|
| Warngau towards München Hbf | RB 56 | Reichersbeuern towards Lenggries |
| Warngau towards München Hbf | RB 57 | Moosrain towards Tegernsee |
Location
- Location within Bavaria Location within Germany Location within Europe

The Schaftlach station is the railway station of Schaftlach and the only railway station in the municipality of Waakirchen in the district of Miesbach in Upper Bavaria. It is located on the Holzkirchen-Lenggries railway line, which opened in 1874, and has been a junction station since 1883, when the privately operated Schaftlach-Tegernsee railway went into service.

== Facilities ==
The station has a side platform at track 1 and an accessible island platform between tracks 1 and 2. The island platform between tracks 2 and 3 is no longer in operation for regular passenger services. At track 1, trains coming from Munich are split, at track 2, trains going to Munich are joined. Track 3 is a passing loop without connection to the line to Tegernsee. The Tegernseebahn never had its own facilities at Schaftlach.

| Track | Height in cm | Length in m | Usage |
|---|---|---|---|
| 1 | 76 | 160 | Trains in the direction of Tegernsee station and Lenggries |
| 2 | 76 | 227 | Trains in the direction of Munich |
| 3 | 38 | | |

== History ==
At its greatest extent, the station had six tracks, one for freights with a still existing freight station at the bay platform, three platform roads and two through roads, one of which was transformed into a stub track in the direction of Lenggries. Between 1975 and 1999, the coaches of the Bavarian Localbahn Society were stored on this track, and locomotives waited on track four for through coaches from Munich to Tegernsee. Today, the station still has the three platform roads, the first two of which are served by passenger traffic.

== Traffic ==
Until 1998, coaches to Tegernsee from Munich and partly Dortmund were hauled by locomotives of the TAG. Since 1998, trains of the Bayerische Oberlandbahn stop every hour, which run from Munich via Holzkirchen are split or joined in Schaftlach. The front part of the train continues to Lenggries, the rear part runs with a change of direction to Tegernsee. Since 2020, the trains have been operated with LINT railcars.

== Gallery ==
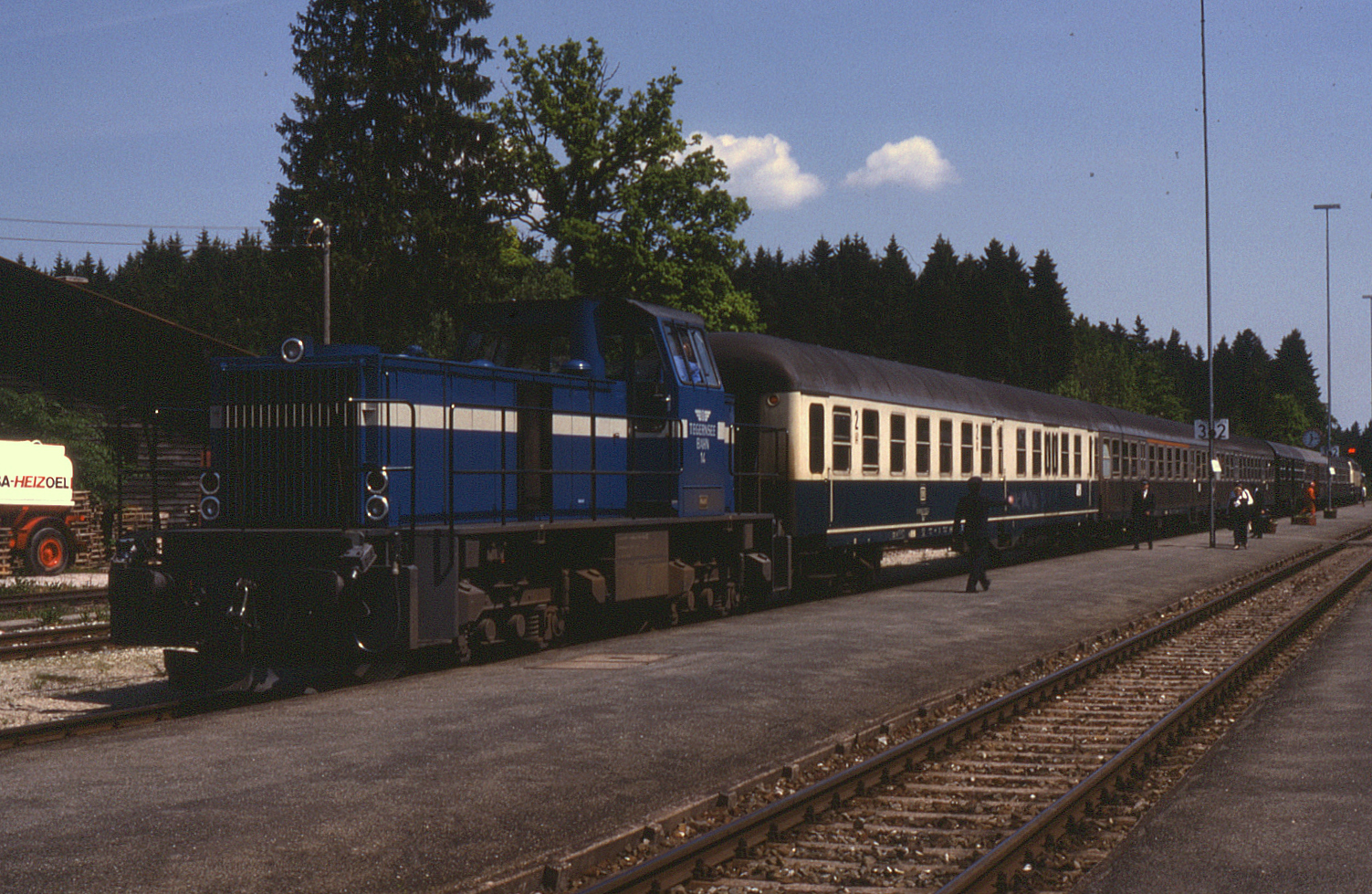
Train with through coaches towards Munich gets merged on track 3.

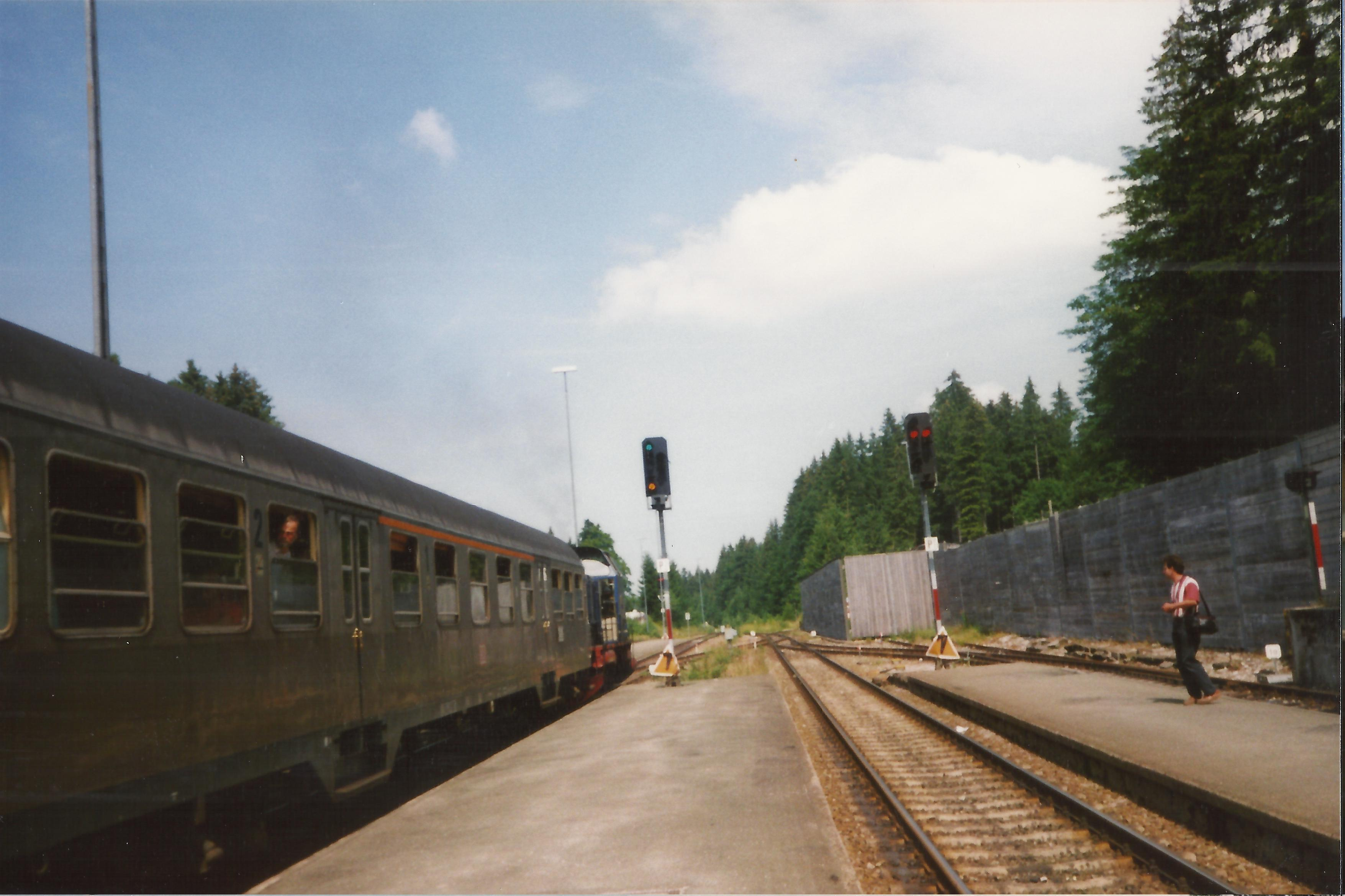
TAG 12 takes over through coaches from Munich on track 2.

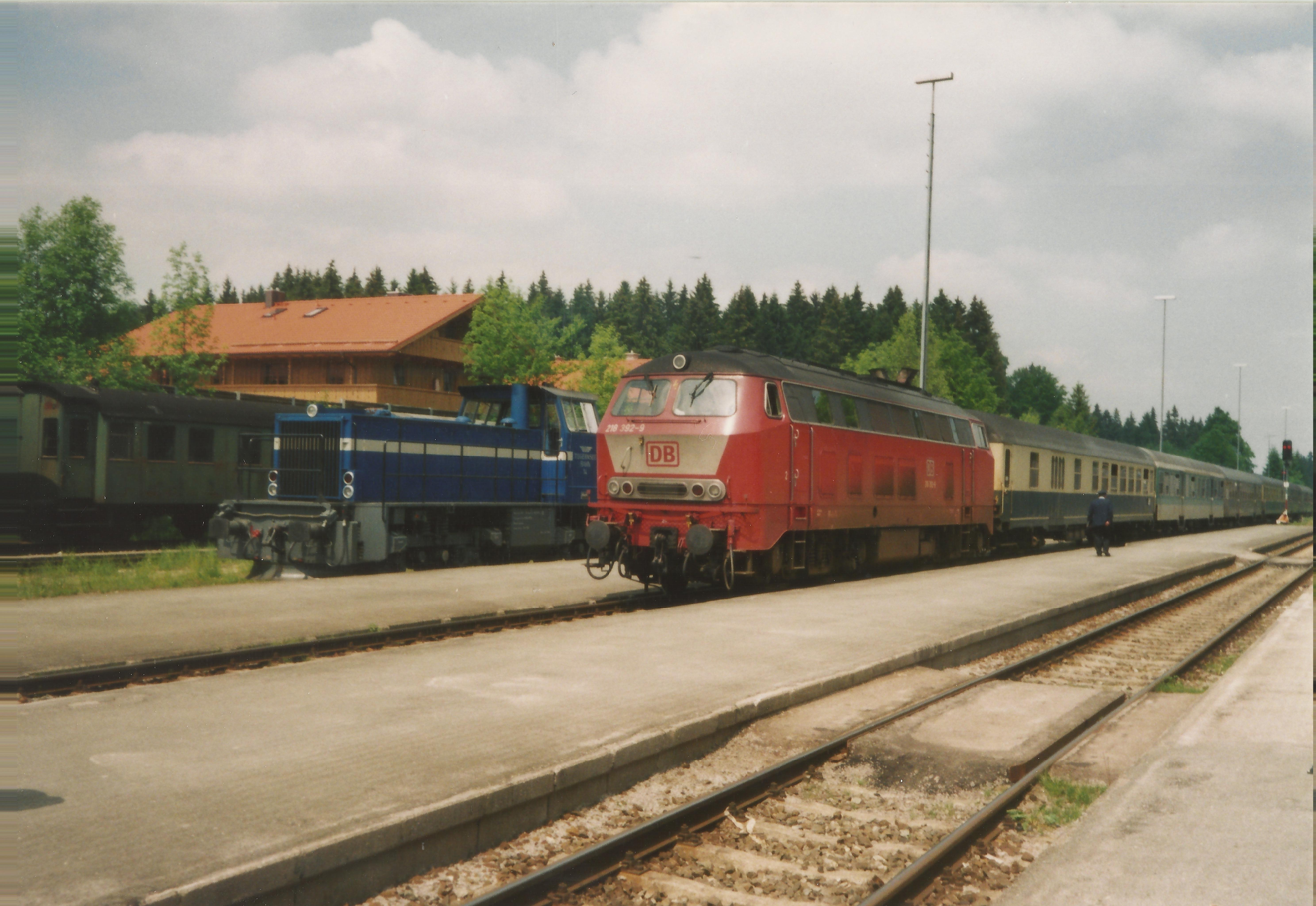
TAG 14 awaits through coaches from Munich.

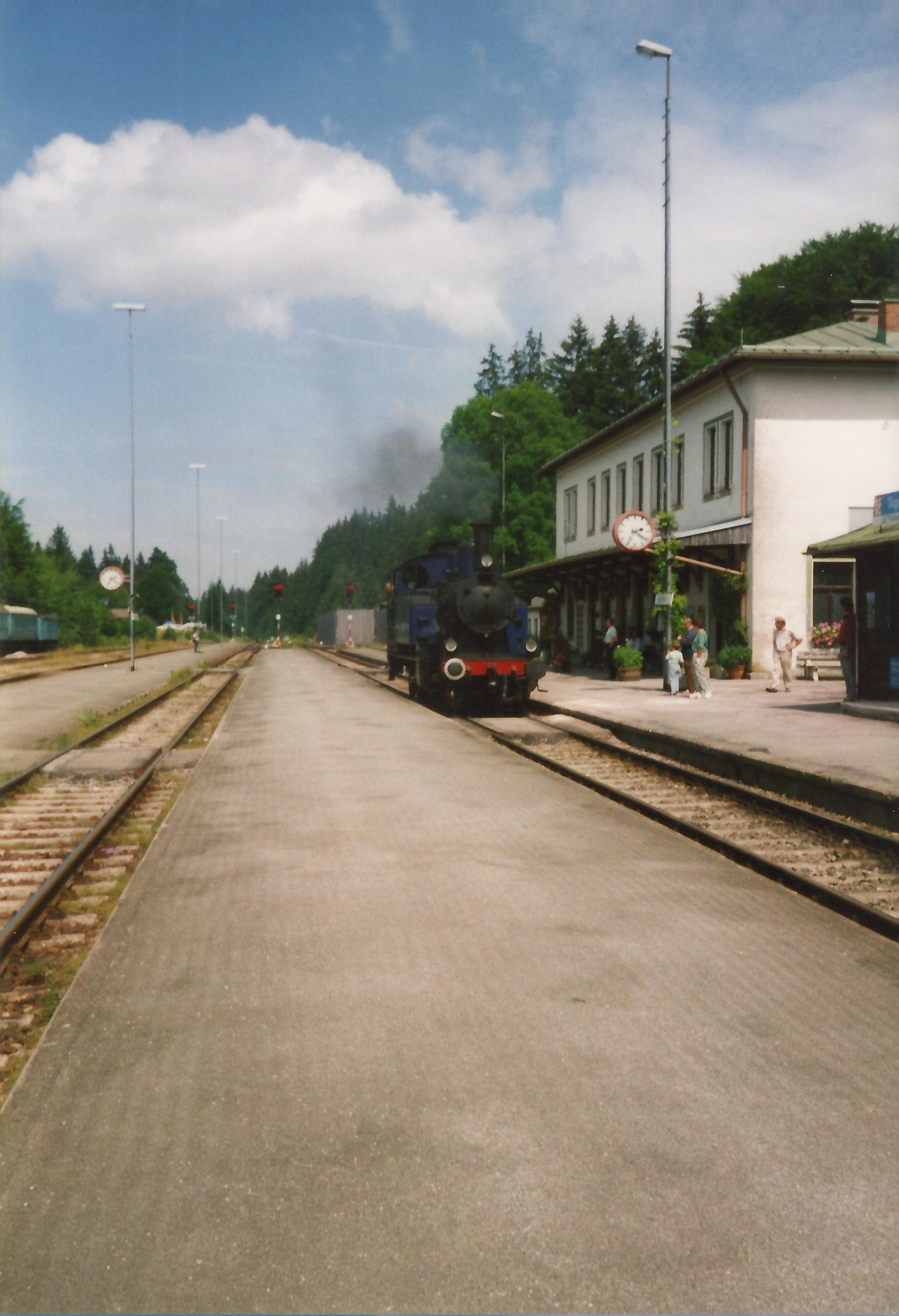
TAG 7.

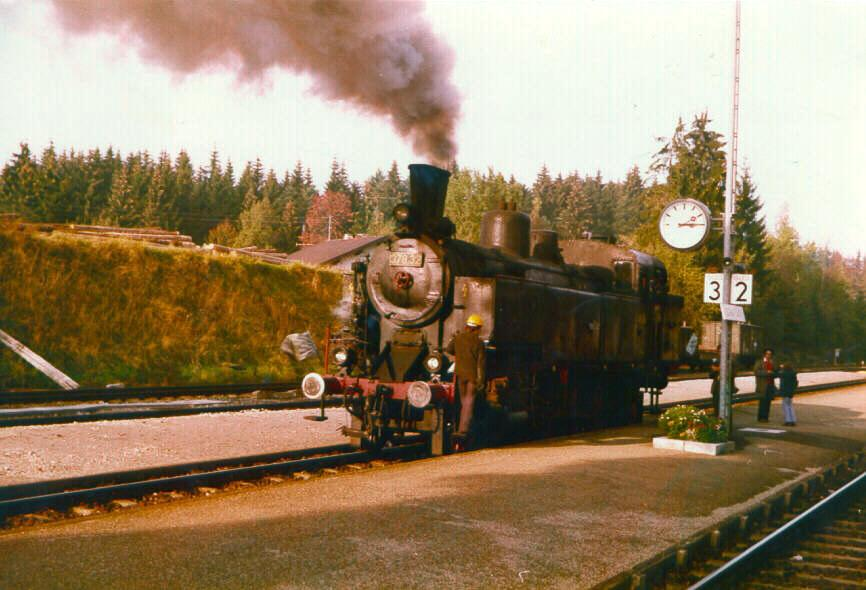
Steam locomotive "Mizzi".

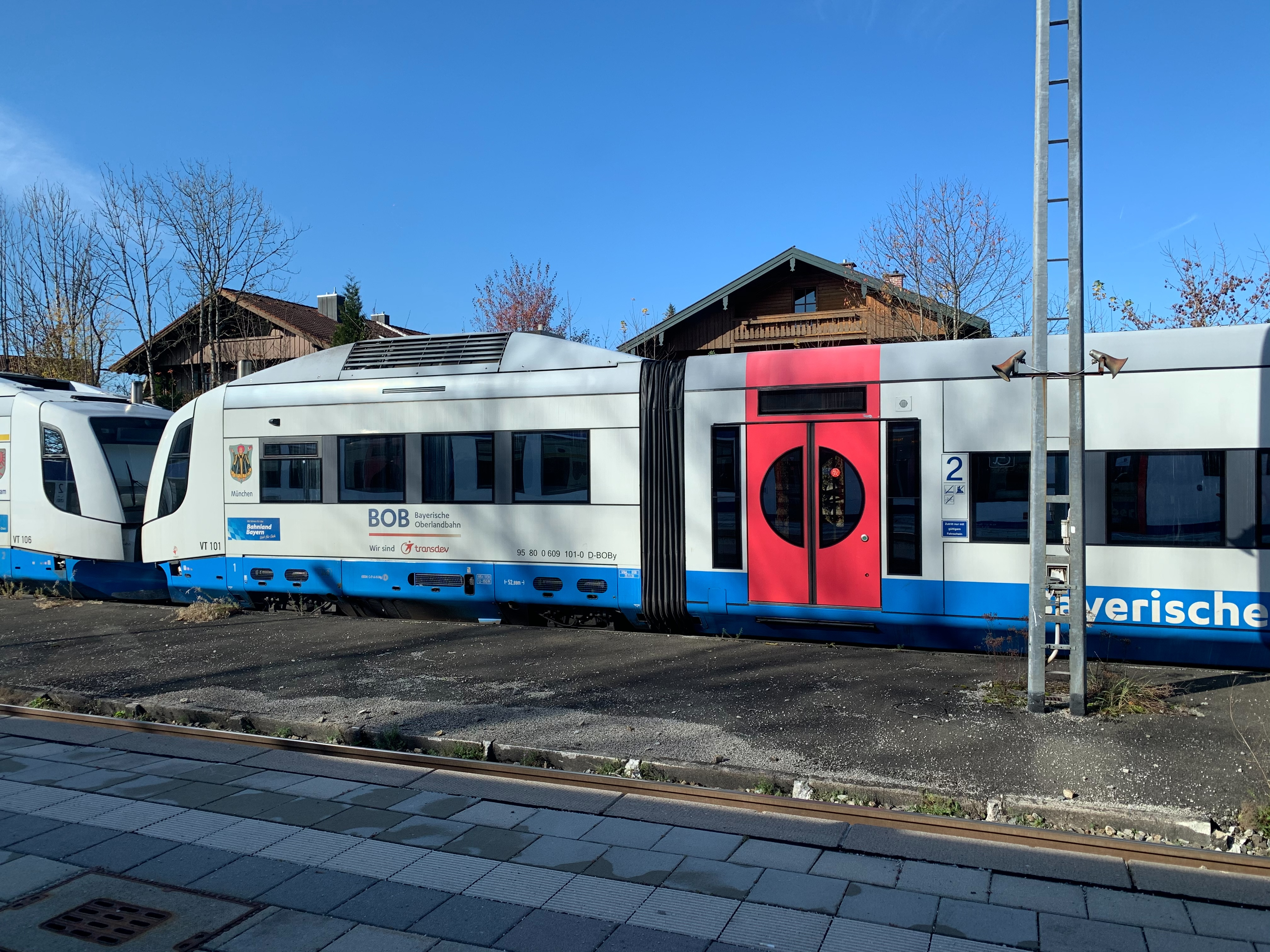
Integral railcar of BOB on track 3.

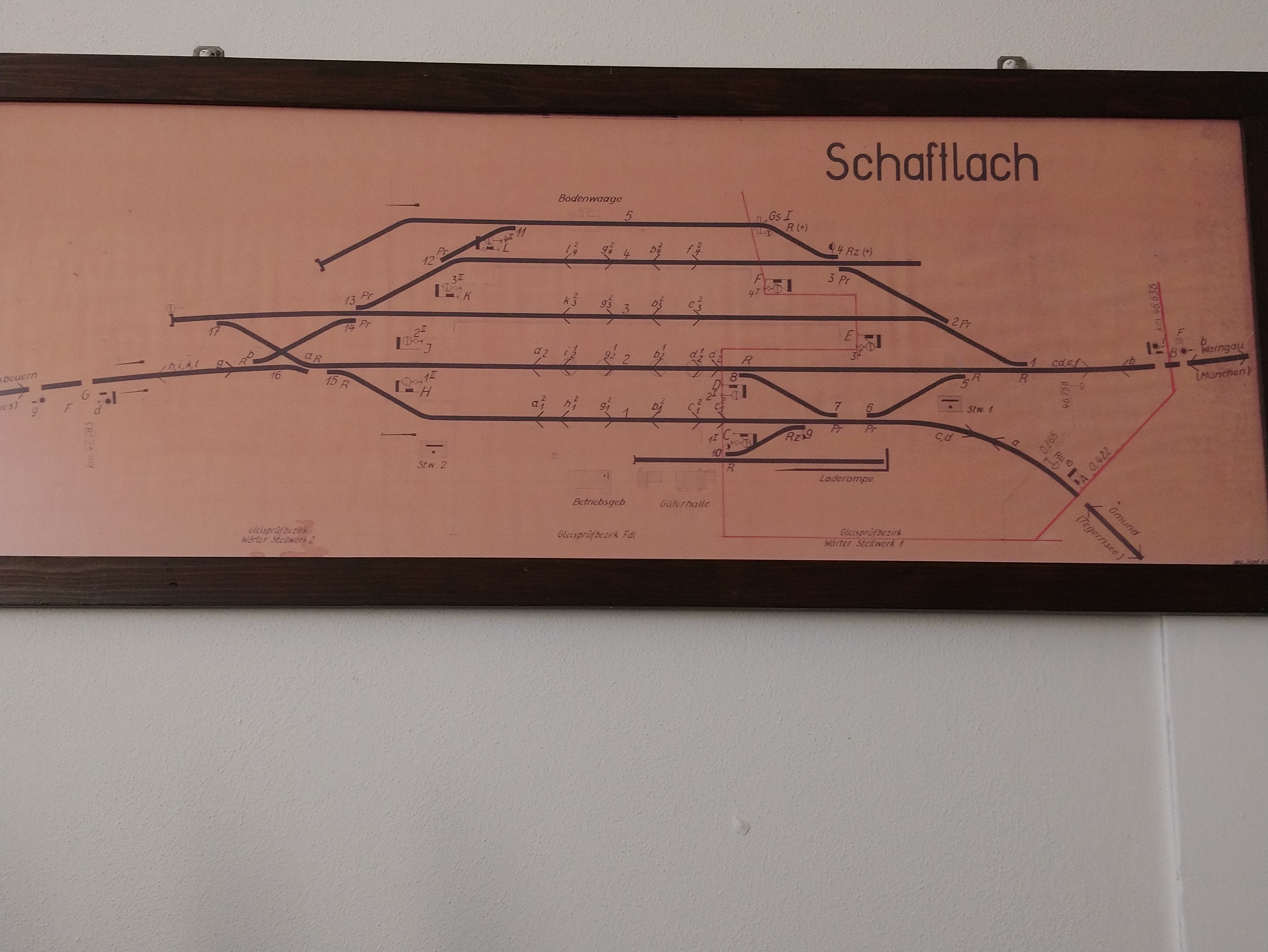
Ancient railway map.

== Links ==
- tegernsee-bahn.de
