= Tegernsee station =

Railway station in Germany

Tegernsee
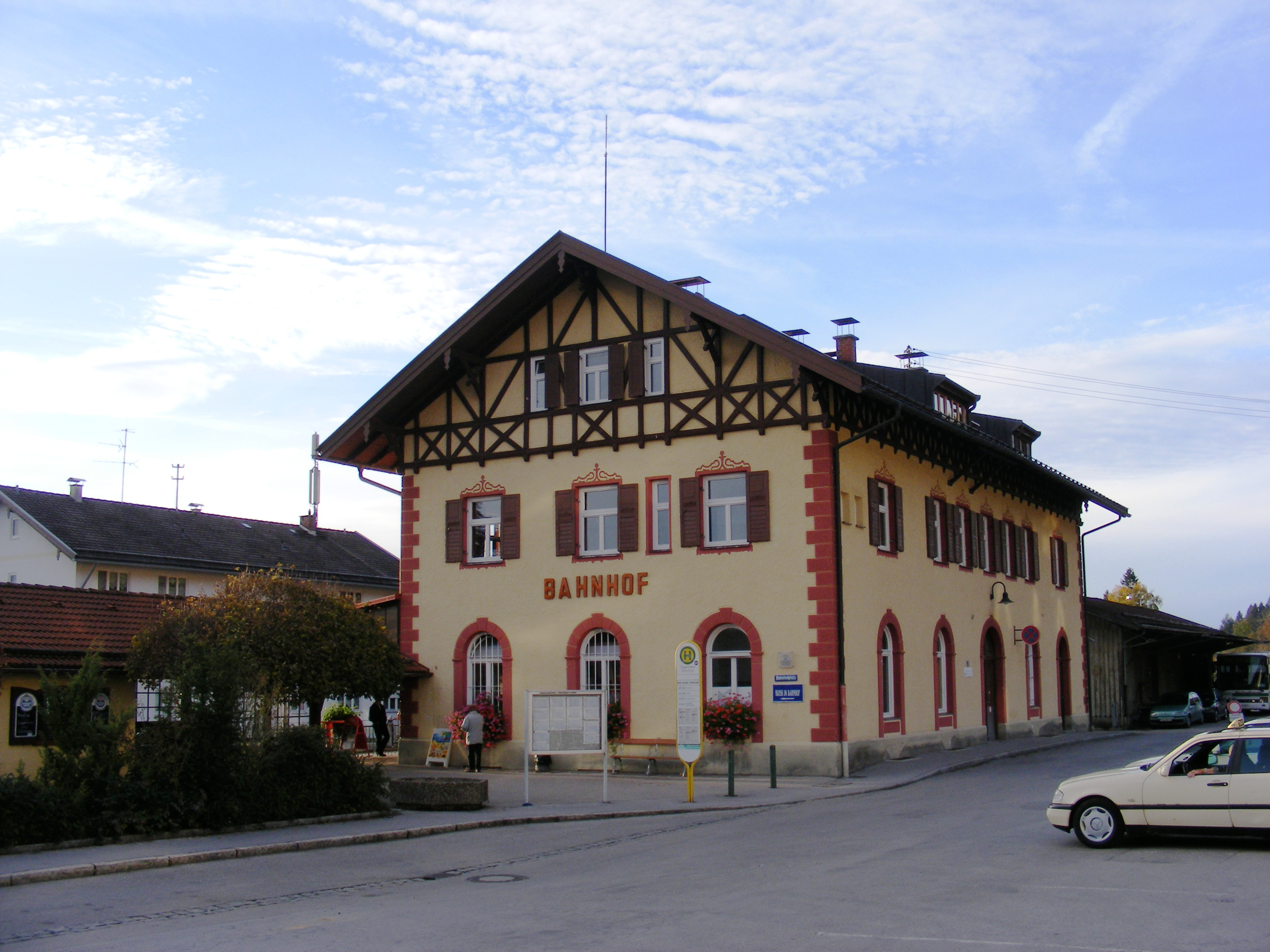

General information
- Location: Tegernsee, Bavaria; Germany
- Coordinates: 47°42′51″N 11°45′26″E
- System: End station
- Owner: Tegernsee-Bahn Betriebsgesellschaft
- Operator: Tegernsee-Bahn Betriebsgesellschaft
- Line: Schaftlach–Tegernsee
- Platforms: 3

Other information
- Website: tegernsee-bahn.de

History
- Opened: 1 May 1902

Services
Preceding station		Following station
Gmund towards München Hbf	RB 57	Terminus
Location
- Location within Bavaria Location within Germany Location within Europe

The Tegernsee station (Tegernsee Bf) is the railroad station of the town of Tegernsee in the district of Miesbach, Upper Bavaria. It is the terminus of the railroad line coming from Schaftlach. Tegernsee station was built as part of the extension of the railroad line from Gmund station and was ceremonially opened on May 1, 1902.

== Facilities ==
The station has a side platform, accommodating track 1 and, as a bay platform, the stub track (originally track 5 with freight station, track 2), and an island platform between tracks 1 and 12, the original track 2. The third track is used for transferring locomotive-hauled trains and leads to a siding (originally with a loading ramp with freight shed for freight cars). In addition, the railroad facilities include a railcar shed and, opposite, a two-stand locomotive shed with water crane and workshop.

Track (operational)	Track (traffic)	Length in m	Height in cm	Usage
11	1	320	38	Trains in the direction of Gmund am Tegernsee
12	12	146	38	parking position and special trains
13		236		siding
14		45		siding
15	2	188	38	Trains in the direction of Gmund am Tegernsee

== History ==
Until 11 October 1998, the station also had a wagon weighbridge at the end of the siding (track 14) and another siding between it and the locomotive shed. Until 2013, the station consisted of the still existing building consisting of waiting hall, ticket office and lever frame (no longer in operation), the now demolished building for service apartments and the one-story connecting piece of restaurant and toilets. Instead of the demolished toilets sanitary facilities were created on the first floor of the service building in the area of the waiting hall. The owner is the 1983 from the TAG spun off Tegernsee-Bahn Betriebsgesellschaft, which since 2012 is owned by the municipalities of Tegernsee, Gmund and the district of Miesbach.

== Traffic ==
Until 1998, Tegernsee station has been served by trains of the Tegernsee-Bahn Betriebsgesellschaft, which still operates the infrastructure with the stations of Gmund and Tegernsee. Through coaches from Munich and partly further to Dortmund were taken over at the station Schaftlach. Today, trains of the Bayerische Oberlandbahn stop every hour, running from Munich via Holzkirchen and Schaftlach to Tegernsee. Since 2020, the trains are operated with railcars of the type LINT.

Line	Course	Clock frequency
RB 57	Munich - Holzkirchen - Schaftlach - Gmund am Tegernsee - Tegernsee	hourly frequency with additional trains during rush hour, on weekends between 8 am and 12 pm and between 2 pm and 8 pm half-hourly frequency

== Gallery ==
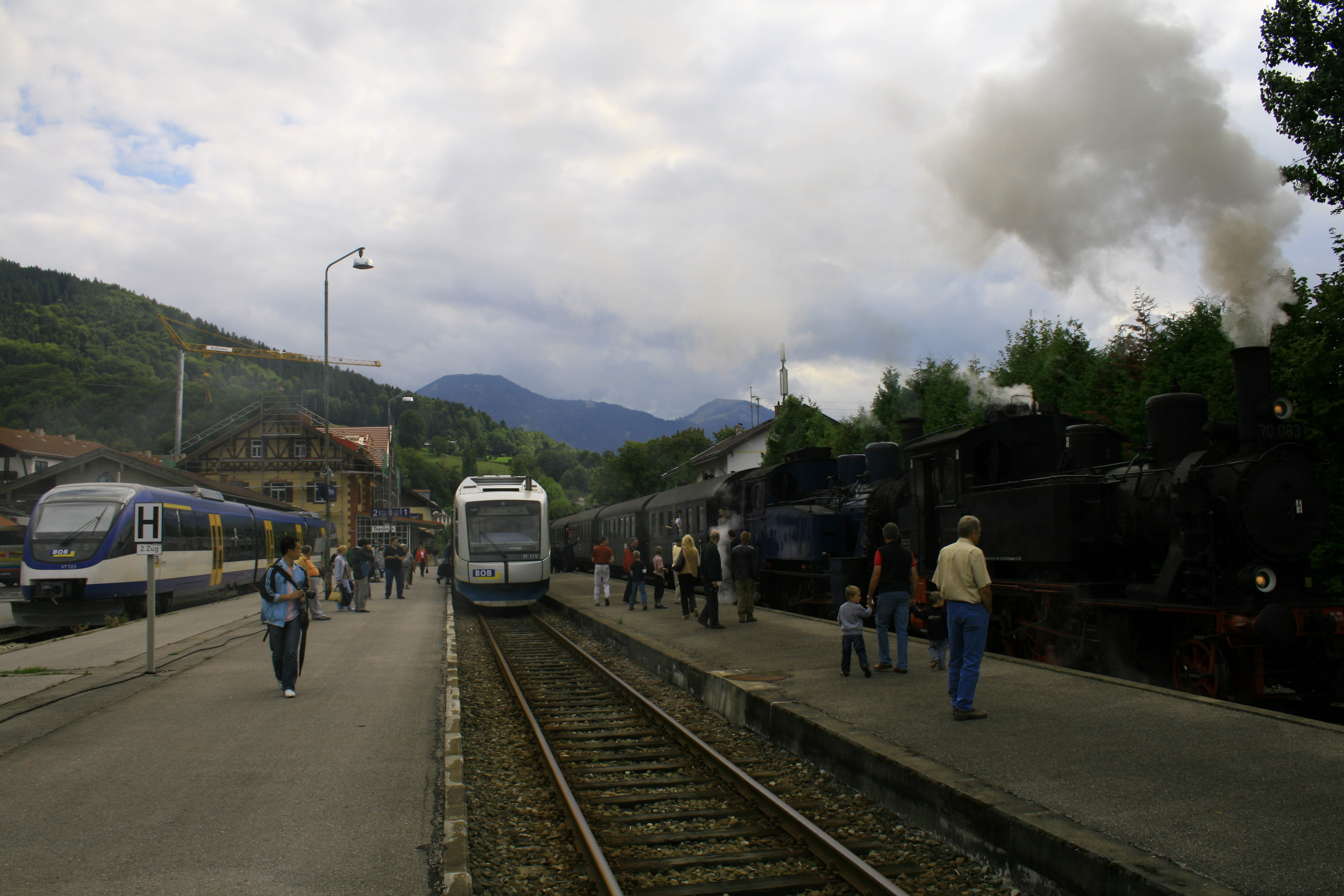
View of station

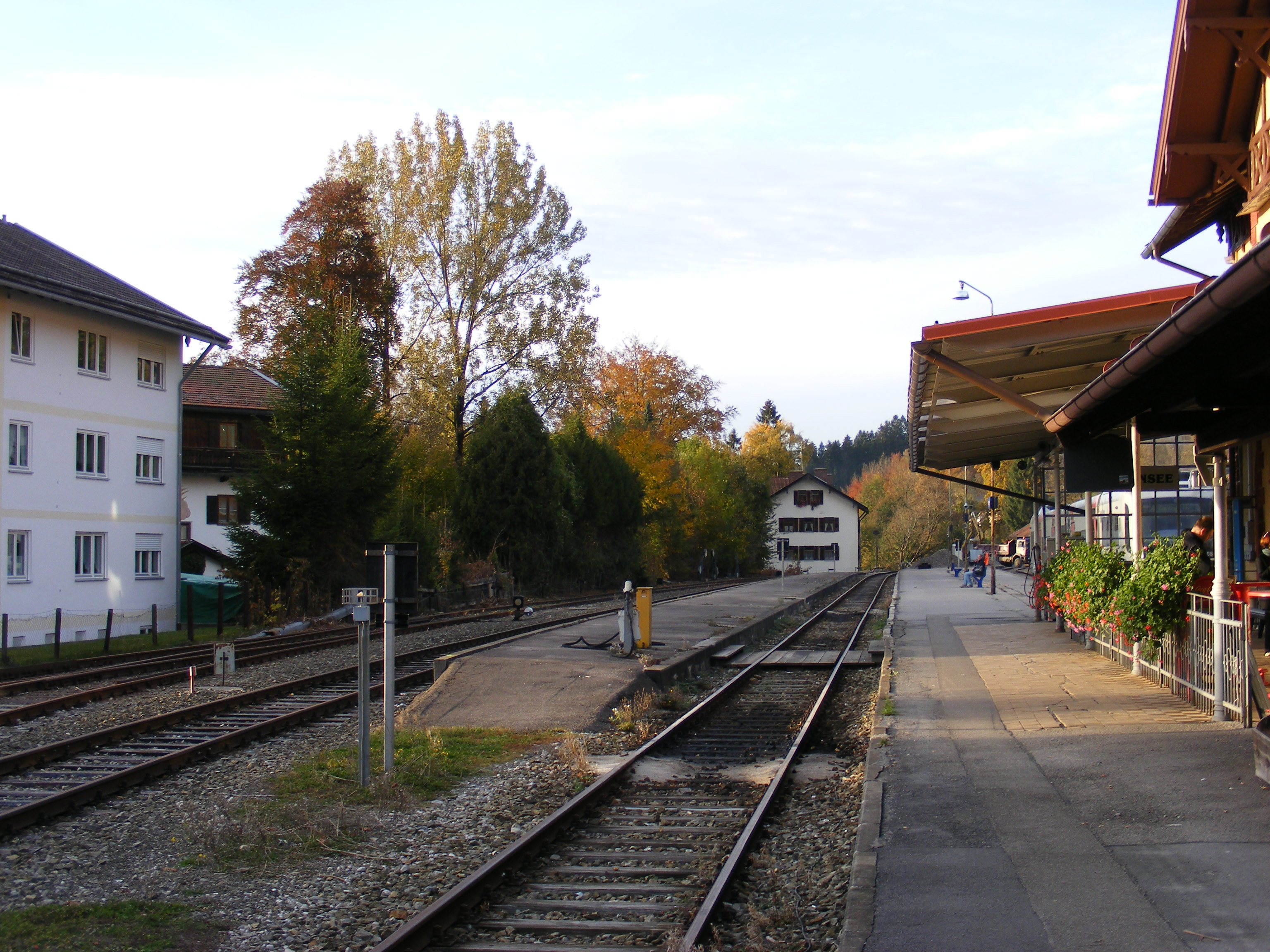
View of station building and platform

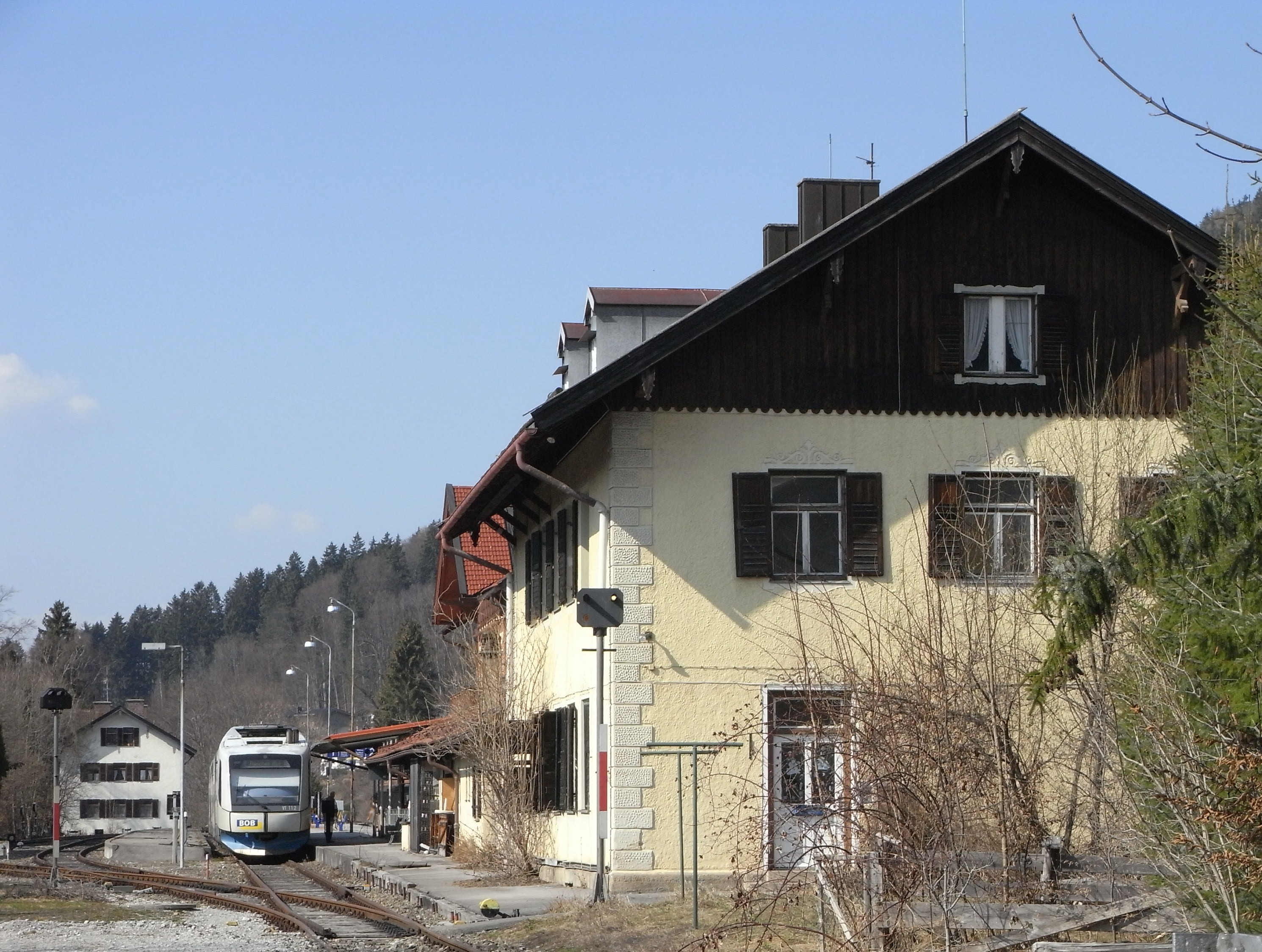
Building for service apartments (demolished in 2013)

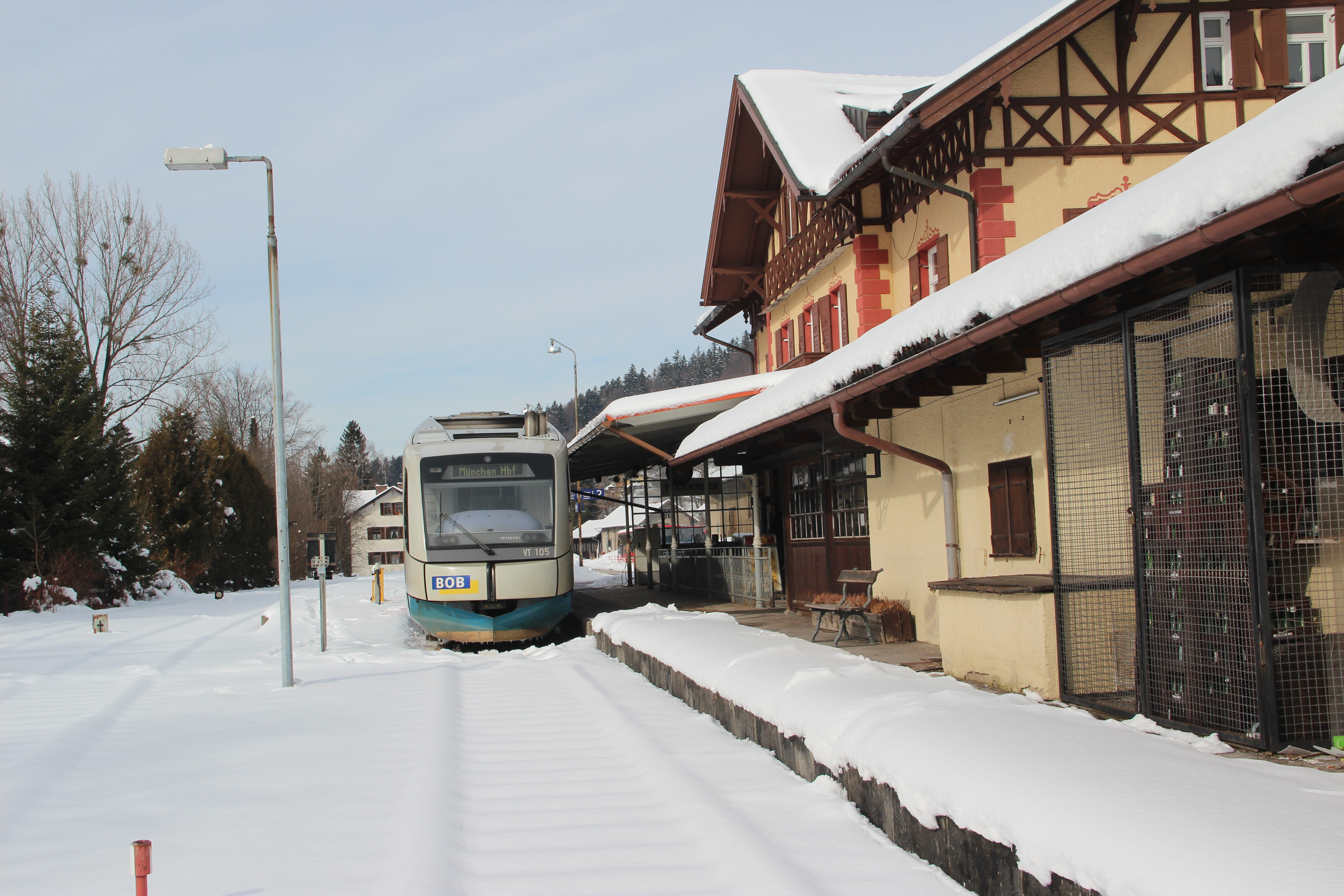
View of the connecting building (demolished in 2013)

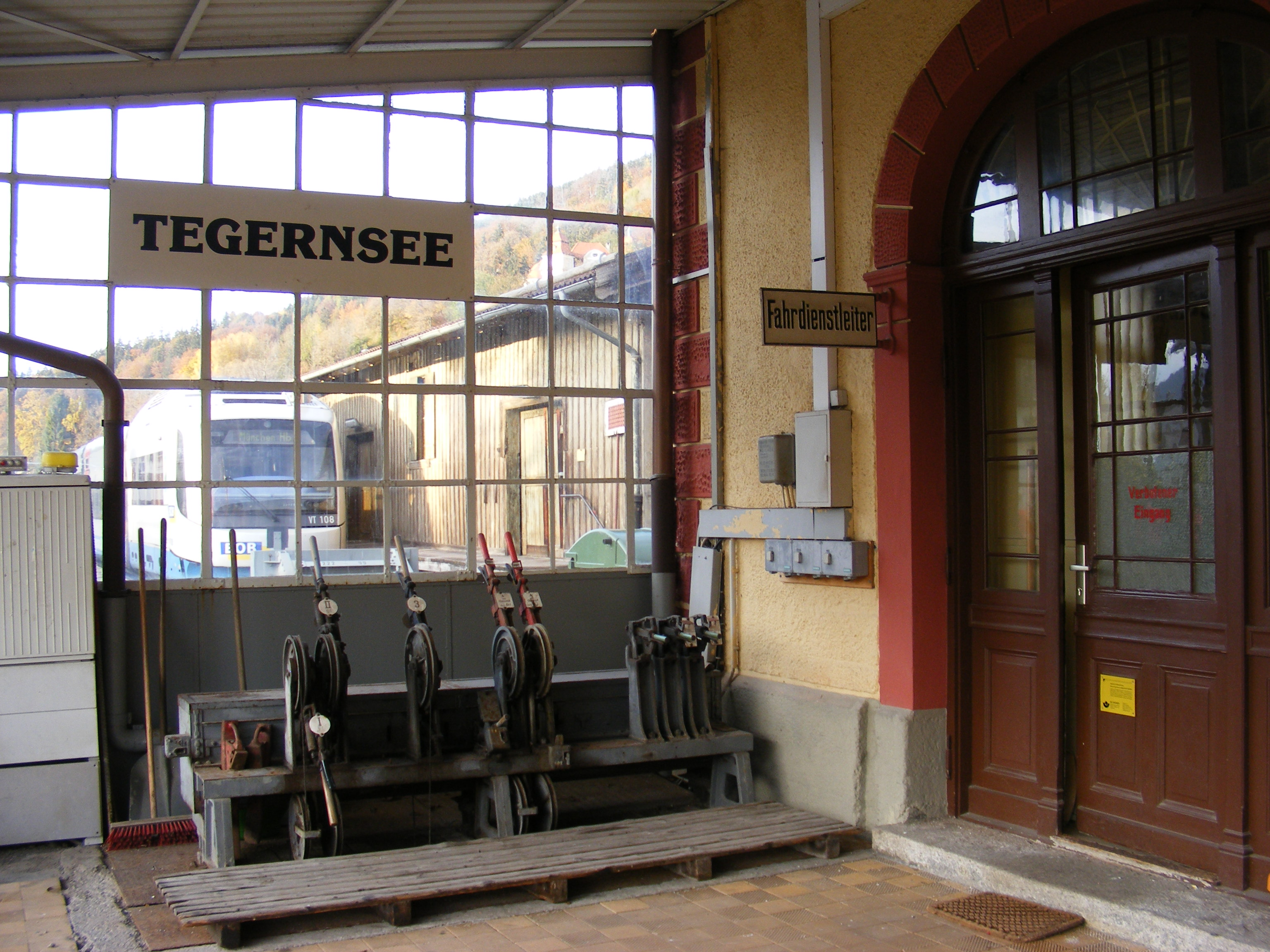
Lever frame

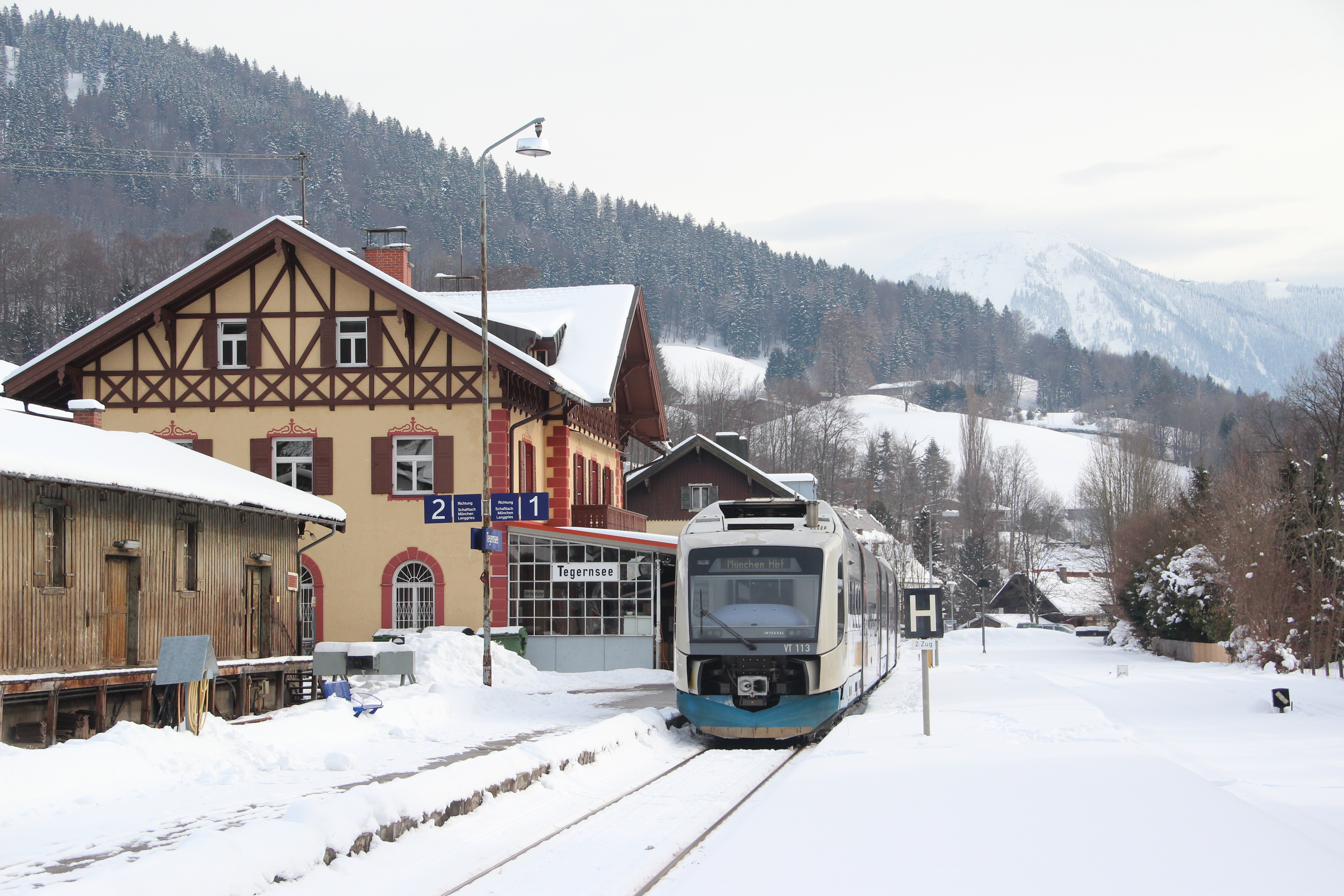
View of freight station

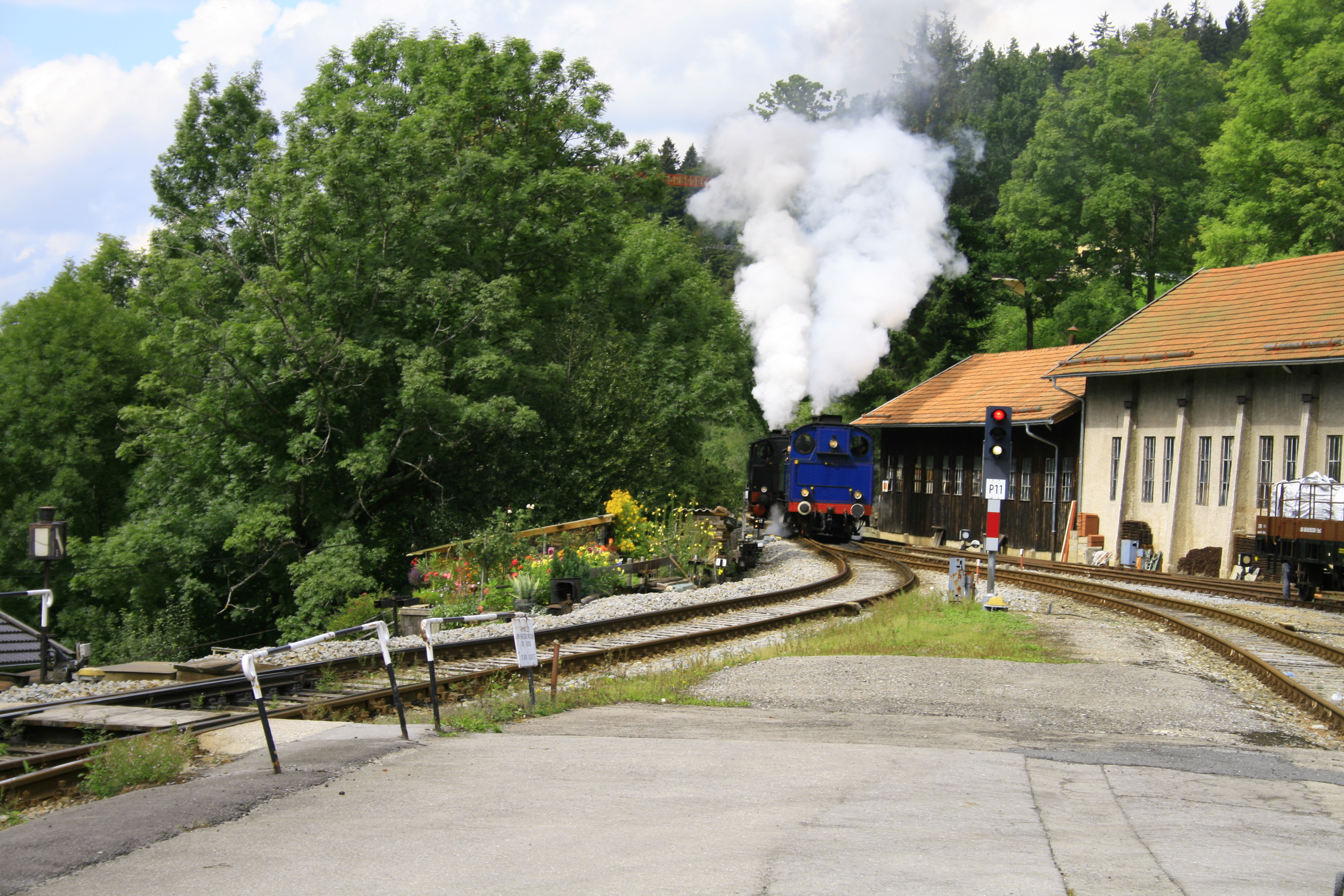
Railcar shed

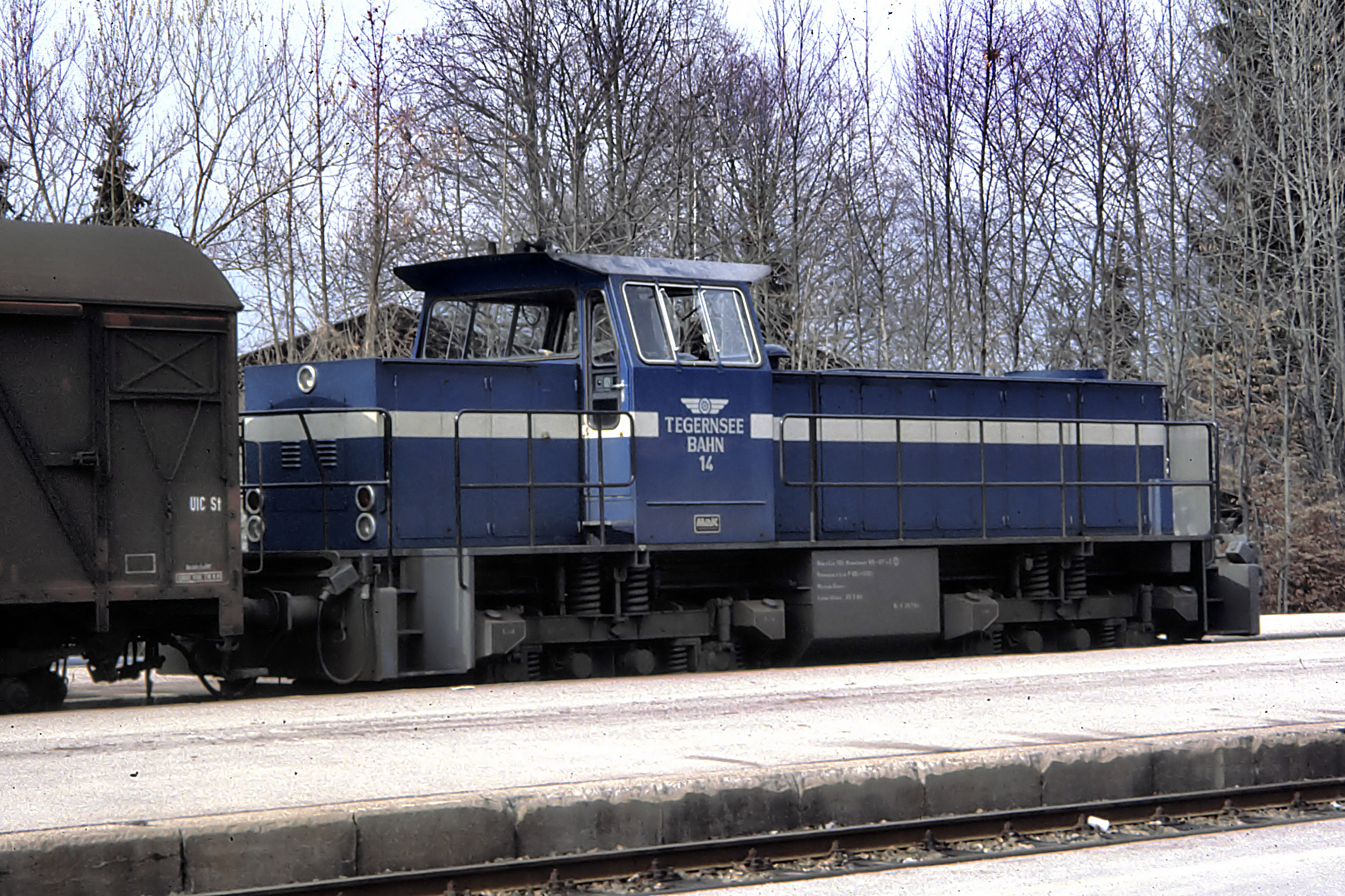
TAG 14

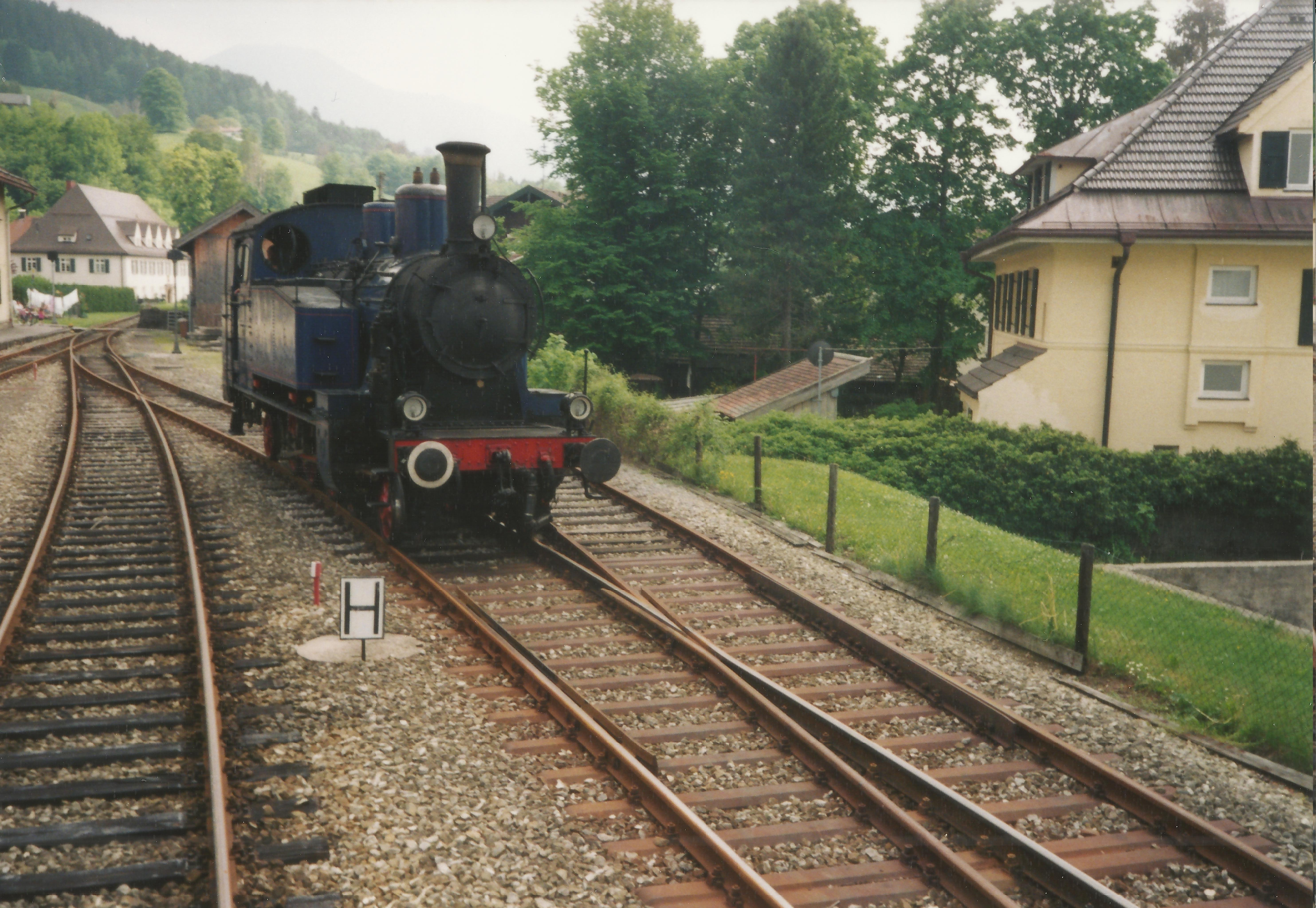
TAG 7 in operation

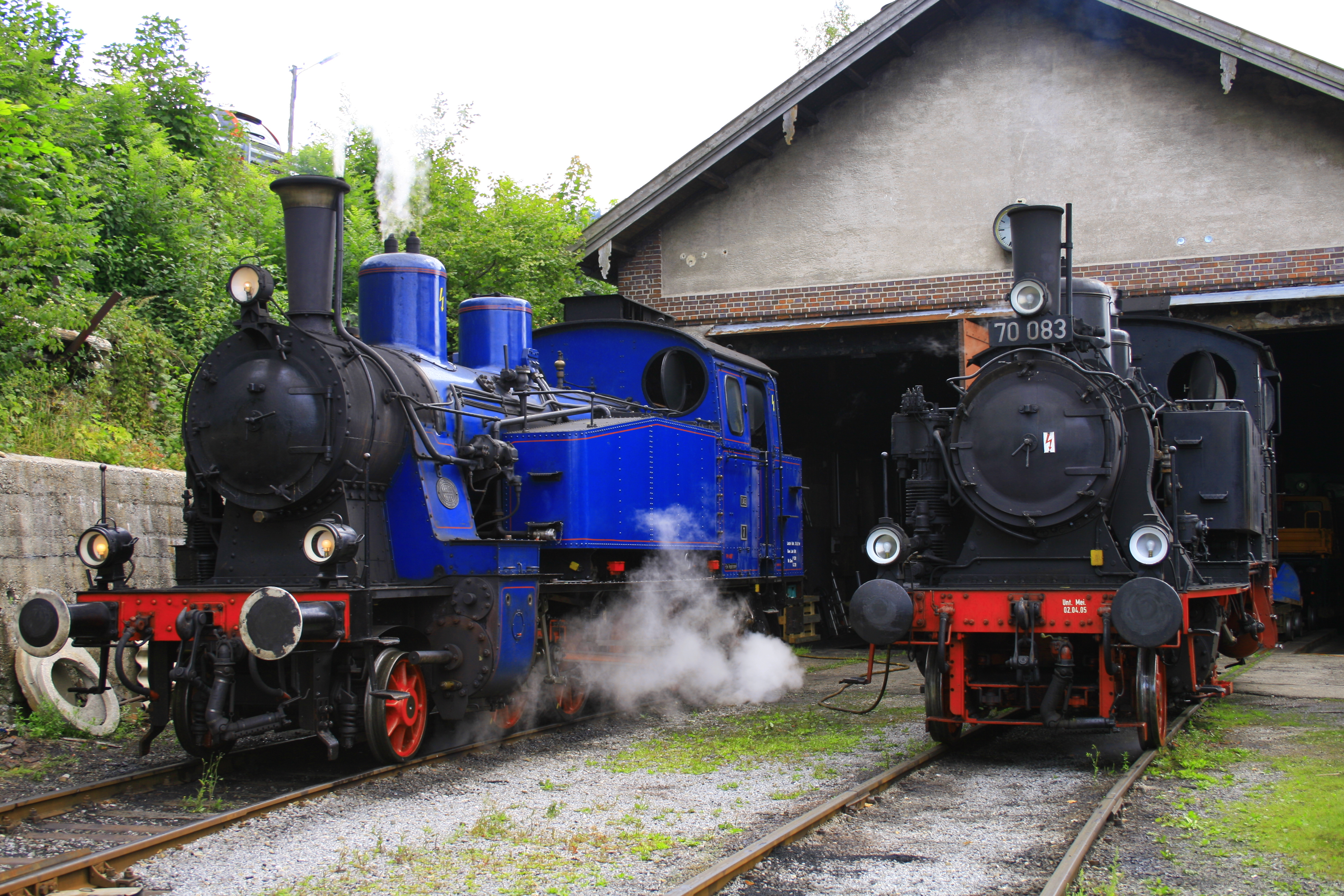
locomotive shed

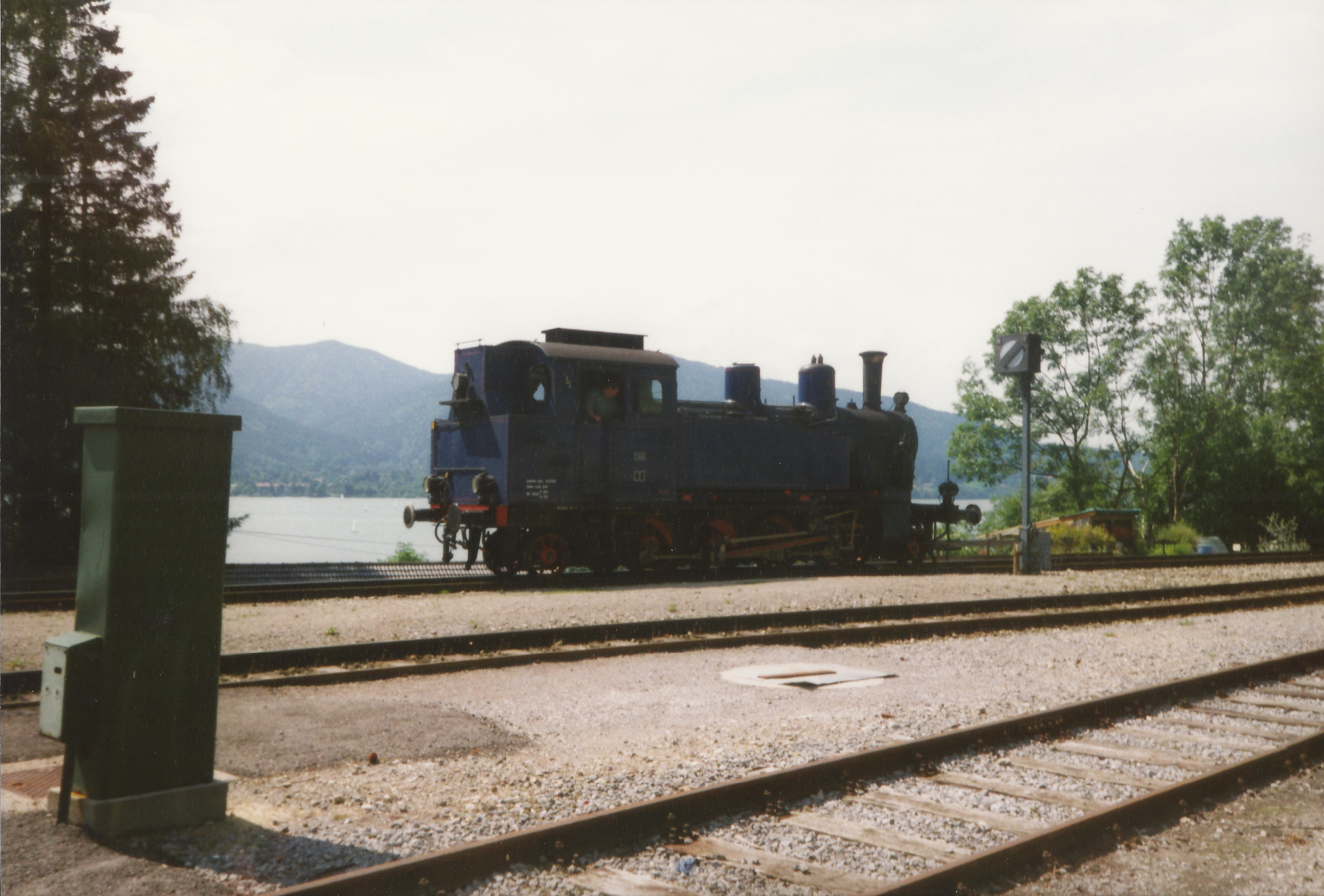
TAG 7 in operation
