= LAG Nos. 87 and 88 =

LAG 87 and 88 DRG Class 98.18
Type and origin
- Power type: Steam
- Builder: Krauss-Maffei
- Serial number: 15633–15634
- Build date: 1937
- Total produced: 2
Specifications
- Configuration
  - Whyte: 2-8-2T
  - UIC: 1′D1′ h2t
  - German: L 46.11
- Driver: 3rd coupled axle
- Gauge: 1,435 mm (4 ft 8 1/2 in)
- Leading dia.: 850 mm (2 ft 9 1/2 in)
- Driver dia.: 1,100 mm (3 ft 7 1/4 in)
- Trailing dia.: 850 mm (2 ft 9 1/2 in)
- Wheelbase
  - Engine: 8,200 mm (26 ft 10 7/8 in)
  - Drivers: 4,200 mm (13 ft 9 3/8 in)
- Length: 11,600 mm (38 ft 3/4 in) over buffers
- Axle load: 11.53 tonnes (11.35 long tons; 12.71 short tons)
- Adhesive weight: 46.16 t (45.43 long tons; 50.88 short tons)
- Loco weight: 60.75 t (59.79 long tons; 66.97 short tons)
- Fuel type: Coal
- Fuel capacity: 2.7 tonnes (2.7 long tons; 3.0 short tons)
- Water cap.: 6.3 m^{3} (6,300 L; 1,400 imp gal; 1,700 US gal)
- Firebox
  - Grate area: 1.74 m^{2} (18.7 sq ft)
- Boiler pressure: 14 kgf/cm^{2} (1.37 MPa; 199 lbf/in^{2})
- Heating surface
  - Firebox: 7.44 m^{2} (80.1 sq ft)
  - Tubes: 38.40 m^{2} (413.3 sq ft)
  - Flues: 20.21 m^{2} (217.5 sq ft)
  - Total surface: 66.11 m^{2} (711.6 sq ft)
- Superheater
  - Heating area: 32.60 m^{2} (350.9 sq ft)
- Cylinders: Two, outside
- Cylinder size: 460 mm × 508 mm (18 1/8 in × 20 in)
- Train brakes: Compressed-air brake
Performance figures
- Maximum speed: 70 km/h (43 mph)
- Power output: 470 PS (346 kW; 464 hp)
Career
- Operators: Lokalbahn AG; Deutsche Reichsbahn; Deutsche Bundesbahn
- Numbers: LAG: 87, 88; DRG: 98 1801, 98 1802
- Retired: 1960

The Bavarian engines with railway numbers 87 and 88 were superheated steam locomotives with the Localbahn AG (LAG). They were the last two engines that the LAG procured because shortly after their delivery in 1937, the company was finally nationalised. The locomotives were largely similar in their design to the TAG 7 locomotive, that had been developed in 1936 by Krauss-Maffei for the Tegernsee Railway AG (Tegernseebahn AG or TAG). TAG 7 (and its two sister engines) were the last branch line (Lokalbahn) locomotives to be designed and built in Bavaria. Unlike the two LAG engines, TAG 7 survived, first as the operating reserve for the Tegernseebahn and later as a museum locomotive. It is maintained by the Bavarian Localbahn Society and regularly used for museum trips around Munich.

TAG 7 and her sisters are the end of a line of development from the first six-wheeled, branch line engines at the end of the 19th century through the Bavarian GtL 4/4 (DRG classes 98.8-9 and 9.16) and the Bavarian GtL 4/5 (DRG Class 98.10 and 98.11). The relationship between the various types is externally very clearly visible. Under the old Bavarian classification scheme, the TAG/LAG engines would have been GtL 4/6 locomotives. Unlike the GtL 4/5, they took the original design of the GtL4/4 and extended it by two carrying axles that were each located in a Krauss-Helmholtz bogie. The coupled wheel diameter was increased from 1,006 to 1,100 mm. This resulted in very good riding qualities in both directions and the top speed could be raised to 70 km/h. The three locomotives were the largest and most powerful Lokalbahn locomotives ever to be operated in Germany.

At first the two LAG engines were stabled in Füssen. Both were transferred to the ownership of the Deutsche Reichsbahn as Class 98.18 and were taken over by the Deutsche Bundesbahn after the Second World War. The remained in service until 1960, at the end in Kempten.

== See also ==
- Lokalbahn AG
- Tegernseebahn
- Royal Bavarian State Railways
- List of Bavarian locomotives and railbuses
