= TAG 7 =

Preserved German steam locomotive

TAG 7
| Quantity | 1 |
| Manufacturer | Krauss-Maffei |
| Entered service | 1936 |
| Wheel arrangement (Whyte) | 2-8-2T |
| Axle arrangement (UIC) | 1'D1' h2t |
| Average axle load | 11.7 Mp; 114.7 kN |
| Length over buffers | 11,600 mm |
| Ø Driving wheels | 1,100 mm |
| Ø Leading wheels | 850 mm |
| Ø Trailing wheels | 850 mm |
| Top speed | 70 km/h |
| Boiler overpressure | 137.3 kN/cm^{2} |
| Piston stroke | 508 mm |
| Cylinder bore | 460 mm |
| Grate area | 1.69 m^{2} |
| Evaporative heating area | 66.11 m^{2} |
| Superheater area | 32.60 m^{2} |
| Power | 470 PSi |
| Adhesive weight | 453.1 kN |
| Service weight | 596.2 kN |
| Brakes | Compressed-air brakes |

The TAG 7 is a superheated steam locomotive, that was developed and built in 1936 by Krauss-Maffei as EAG 7 for the private Schaftlach-Gmund-Tegernsee Railway Company (Eisenbahn-Aktiengesellschaft Schaftlach-Gmund-Tegernsee or EAG) - later the Tegernsee Railway AG (TAG). Today it belongs to the Bavarian Localbahn Union.

This tank locomotive with its 1'D1' axle arrangement, together with its two sister engines LAG Nos. 87 and 88, is the last and most powerful branch line (Lokalbahn) locomotive to be built in Bavaria. Its power of 470 PSi enabled a top speed of 70 km/h in both directions. The EAG needed the new engines to relieve its two smaller locomotives, nos. EAG 5 and 6 (Bavarian GtL 4/4s) and to gradually take the aging and rickety EAG 3 and 4 out of service. TAG 7 proved itself so well, that a year later two more engines were built by the Lokalbahn AG (the aforementioned LAG Nos. 87 and 88).

TAG 7 served until 1975 as the reserve loco for the Tegernsee Railway (TAG), but at the same time, during the 1970s, was already being used for museum runs, organised by a working group of the German Railway History Company or DGEG. Because there was a threat that the engine would have to stop operating and be scrapped due to its licence running out, the Bavarian Localbahn Union was founded in order to raise the money for the required general inspection. The engine - de jure still the property of the TAG - remained stabled during the 1990s at Tegernsee, whilst the Localbahn Union paid for all further inspections and maintenance. In 1999, after the transfer of operations on the Tegernsee Railway to the Bavarian Highland Railway (Bayerische Oberlandbahn), the TAG finally sold the engine to the Union. At the same time the locomotive shed in Tegernsee had to be cleared. TAG 7 has been stationed in Landshut shed since and is once again in service. Since May 2005 TAG 7 has had PZB 90 train running control system. The locomotive is currently out of order due to a boiler damage, the owner BLV plans to build a new boiler.

== See also ==
- List of Bavarian locomotives and railbuses
