= Bavarian Localbahn Society =

German heritage railway operator

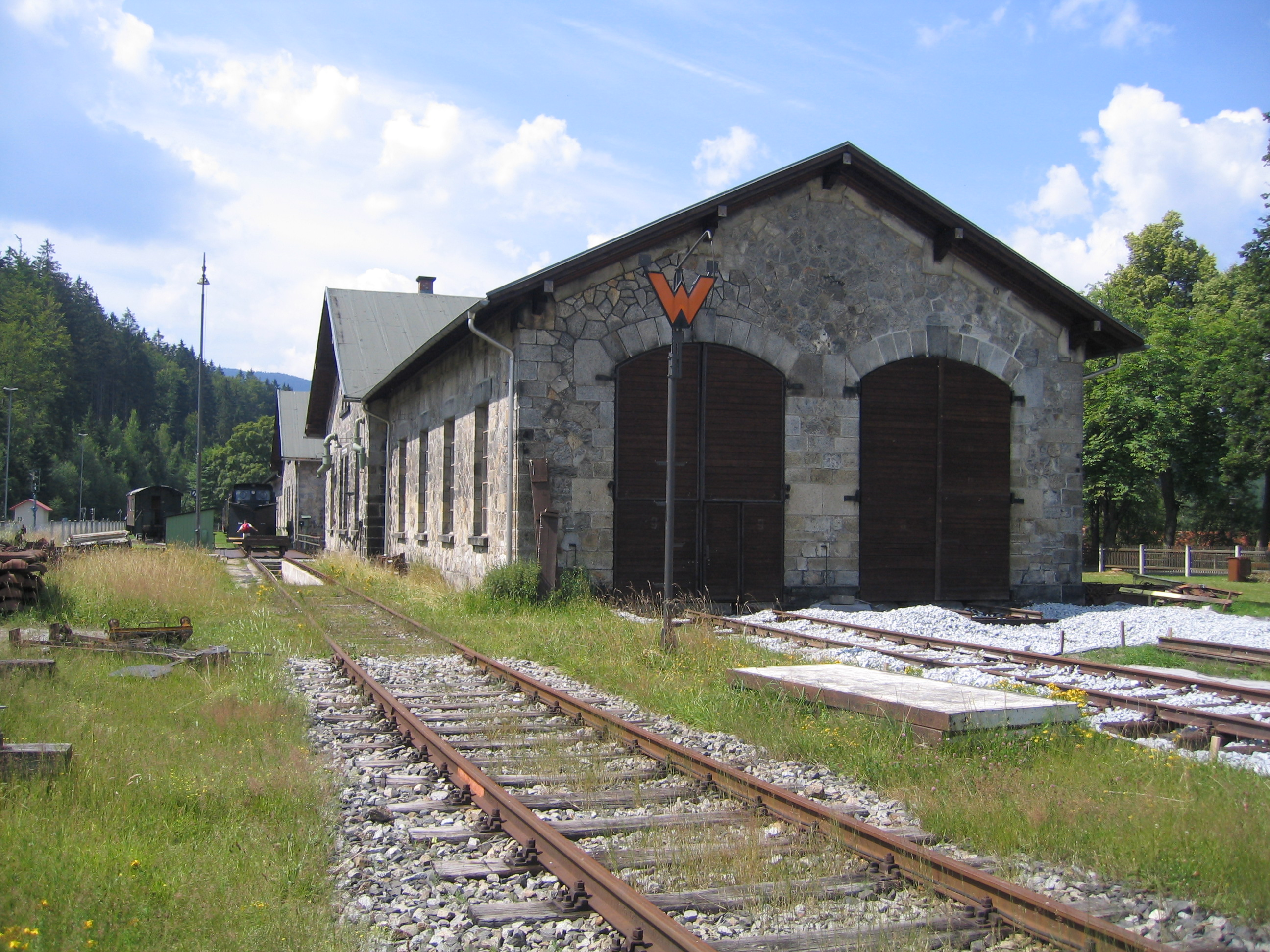
Part of the locomotive shed housing the BLV's Localbahn Museum at Bayrisch Eisenstein in Bavaria, Germany

The Bavarian Localbahn Society (Bayerischer Localbahnverein e.V. or BLV), with its headquarters in Tegernsee, is a society that is concerned with the history of the railways in Bavaria. Localbahn (sometimes Lokalbahn; literally: 'local line') means 'branch line' and is mainly used in southern Germany and Austria in lieu of the usual term Nebenbahn. The BLV's objectives are the operation of historic trains and the collection of historically valuable railway items from Bavaria.

== Operations ==
The society runs the Localbahn Museum in Bayerisch Eisenstein and a locomotive shed in Landshut. It also operates the museum railway Tegernsee-Schaftlach-Holzkirchen

== Localbahn Museum ==
The BLV dedicated its museum to the once common branch lines of the railway - called Vicinalbahnen, Sekundärbahnen or Localbahnen - which connected most of Bavaria in the 19th century. Many of them have now fallen prey to the structural changes or have been changed to suburban trains in the vicinity of large cities.

The museum is installed in the former engine shed of Bayerisch Eisenstein on the border to the Czech Republic. The round shed with its seven tracks as well as the two-tracked long house contain steam engines, electric and diesel locomotives, passenger coaches as well as goods wagons from 1890 to 1949. Special exhibitions cover issues such as the construction of railway lines. The open-air area has a working turntable. On some weekends the museum offers rides to Bohemia with historical steam trains. The society also owns a restored local steam train and offers rides from Landshut.

== History ==
The Bavarian Localbahn Society emerged from a working group of the German Railway History Company (Deutsche Gesellschaft für Eisenbahngeschichte or DGEG), that ran steam train services between 1969 and 1975 on the private Tegernsee Railway (Tegernsee-Bahn). Because the operating licence for the locomotive (TAG 7) ran out and neither DGEG nor the Tegernsee Railway wanted to take on the cost of the general inspection, the Bavarian Localbahn Society was founded. To keep operations going during the period whilst TAG 7 was out of service the steam engine 378.32 was purchased in Austria. In 1978, TAG 7 was once again back in service as well, and the Austrian engine took over historical steam services on the Regen Valley railway until it was sold in 1996. The engine, J. A. Maffei, was also working on the Tegernsee Railway until the 1990s and now stands in the society's own museum. The Bavarian Localbahn Museum was established between 1981 and 1994, in the old locomotive shed built in Bayerisch Eisenstein in 1877. In 1999 the shed and tracks at Tegernsee had to be cleared and the TAG 7 steam train moved to Landshut. Since 2005 the society has once again owned an operational steam engine, a former Bavarian Pt 2/3, number 70 083. On September 11, 2005, the BLV celebrated its 30 years of existence with both a Class 70 and the TAG 7 steam engines operating.

== Rolling stock ==
=== Steam locomotives ===
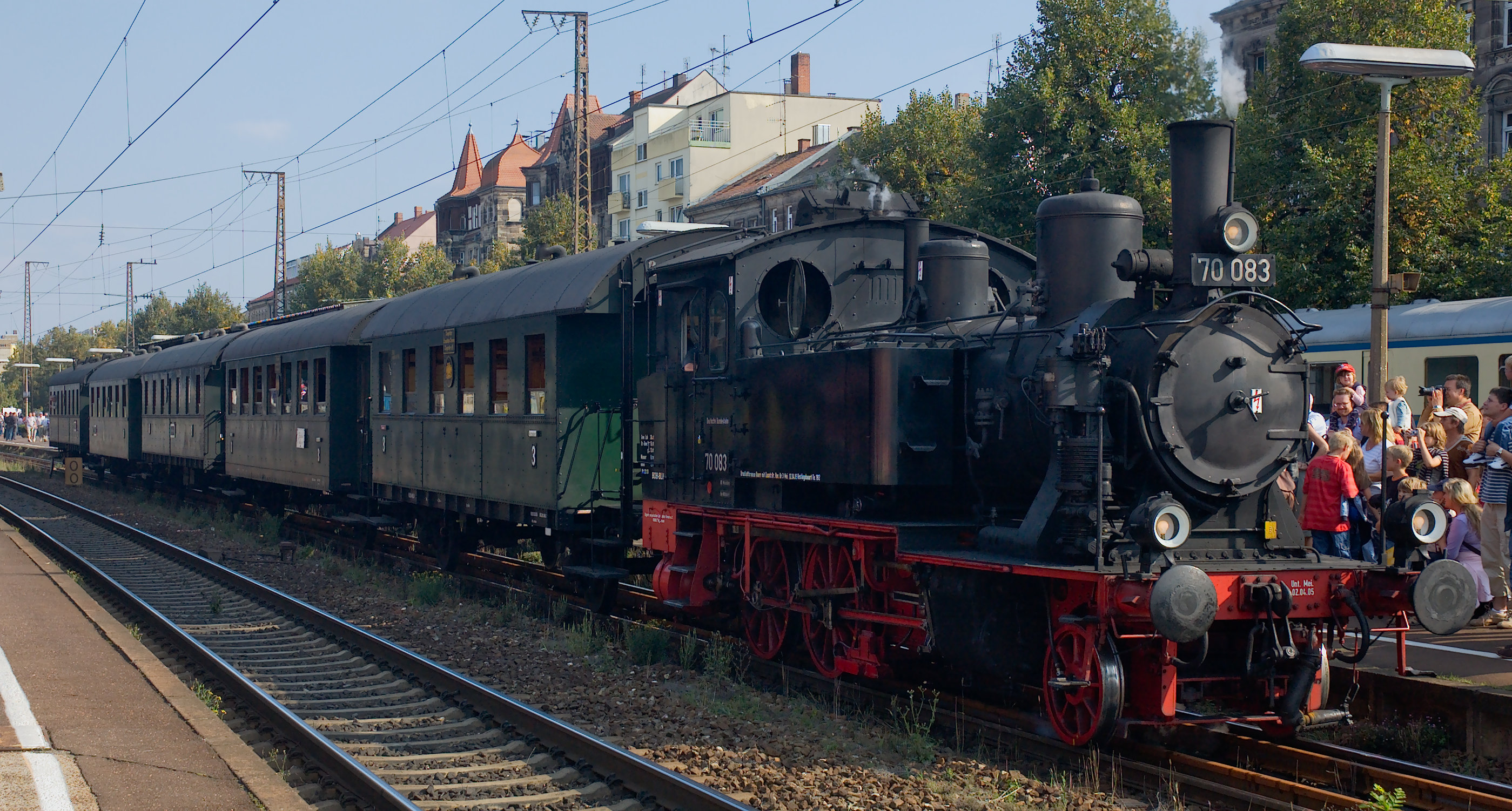
The BLV steam train headed by locomotive no. 70 083

- 02 / ANNA of the Gotteszell-Viechtach Lokalbahn operated by the Regentalbahn, built by Krauss & Cie, 1890
- 1854 from the Royal Bavarian State Railways operated by the Regentalbahn, built by Krauss & Cie, 1892. (Was numbered 98 7658 in the DR system.)
- J.A. Maffei of the firm of Maffei, built by J.A. Maffei, 1902
- OSSER from the Lam-Kötzting Lokalbahn operated by the Regentalbahn, built by J.A. Maffei, 1922
- Nr. 4 / Bayerwald operated by the Regentalbahn, built by J.A. Maffei, 1927
- Nr. 5 / Deggendorf operated by the Regentalbahn, built by J.A. Maffei, 1927
- SCHWARZECK from the Lam-Kötzting Lokalbahn operated by the Regentalbahn, built by J.A. Maffei, 1928
- TAG 7 of the Tegernsee Railway Company, built by Krauss-Maffei, 1936
- 70 083 from the Royal Bavarian State Railways, built by Krauss & Cie, 1913
- Fireless locomotive Spiritus Nr. 2 of the VEB Spiritus Wittenberg, built by J.A. Maffei, 1915

=== Diesel locomotives ===
- RL 3 from Grün und Bilfinger Co., built by Orenstein & Koppel, 1935
- WR 200 B14 (=V20) of the German Army, OHE, built by Klöckner-Humboldt-Deutz, 1941
- A6 11517 (DRG Köf II) from Bayerwerk AG, built by Klöckner-Humboldt-Deutz, 1949
- MV 3 from the firm of Fritzmeier, built by Orenstein & Koppel, 1963

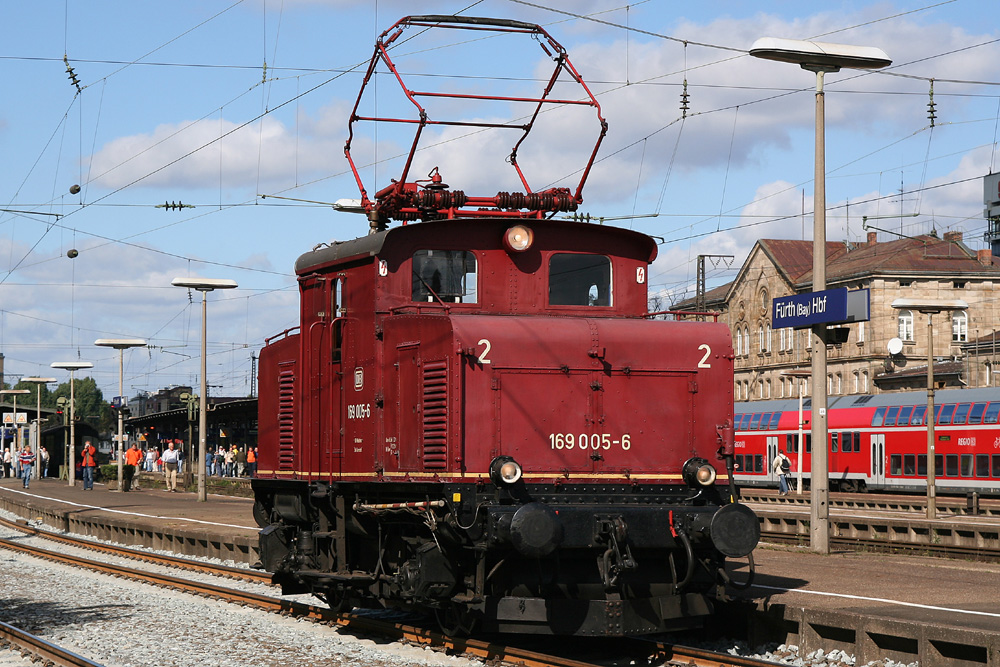
169 005 in Fürth

=== Electric locomotives ===
- LAG 5, 169 005, built by J.A. Maffei / SSW, 1930

=== Railbuses ===
- ET 5 of the Salzburg Railway and Tramway Company, built by MAN / ÖSSW, 1908
- VT 07 from the Lam-Kötzting Lokalbahn operated by the Regental Line, built by MAN, 1939
- VT 10.05 (Uerdingen railbus) from the Graz-Köflach Railway, built by Waggonfabrik Uerdingen, 1955

=== Other rolling stock ===
The society has over 19 passenger coaches from the period 1889 to 1958, 8 goods wagons from the years 1883 to 1920 as well as various inspection trolleys.

== Organisation ==
The BLV has at present around 300 members. The company offices are in Tegernsee. The Localbahn Museum at Bayerisch Eisenstein is under the private trusteeship of the society.

== See also ==
- DGEG
- Royal Bavarian State Railways
- List of Bavarian locomotives and railbuses
