= DGEG =

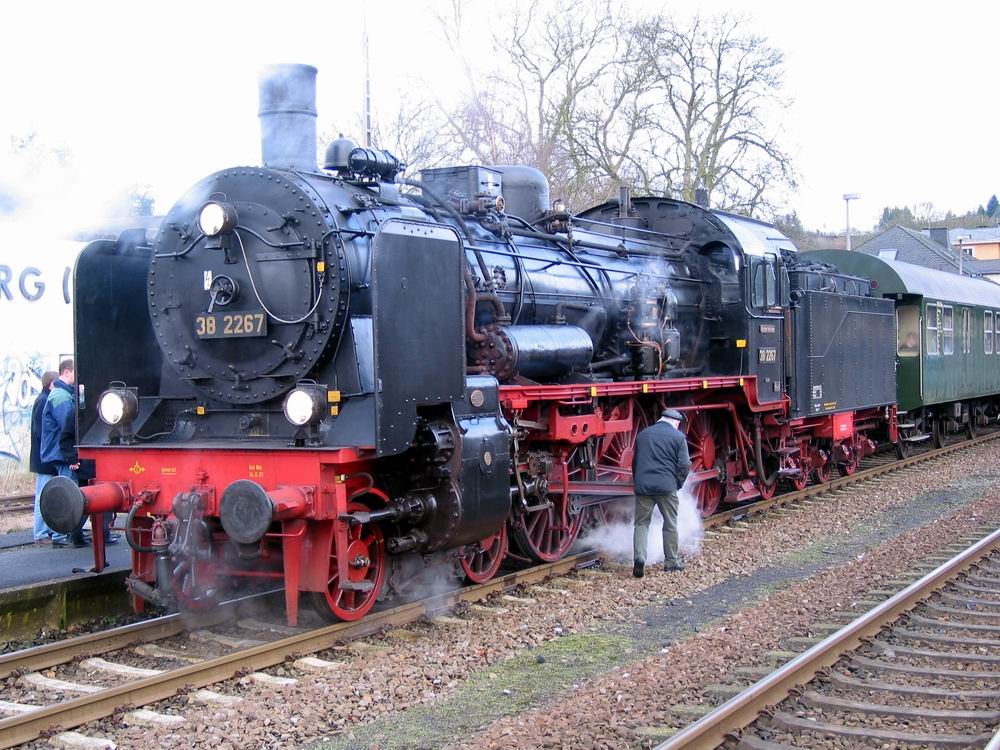
Prussian P 8 of the DGEG railway museum at Bochum-Dahlhausen

The German Railway History Company (Deutsche Gesellschaft für Eisenbahngeschichte) or DGEG is a society concerned with the history of the railways. The objectives of the society are:

- to generate and maintain interest and understanding for the history of the railways within the framework of overall history,
- to foster scientific studies in this area,
- to preserve and maintain important cultural and technological monuments.

== History ==
The society was founded on 22 April 1967 in Karlsruhe and was entered on the official register of clubs and societies there. Members of the society were able to gradually restore the Bochum-Dahlhausen locomotive shed and its surroundings to their former condition after their closure by the Deutsche Bundesbahn on 1 August 1969. Because the arrival of railway vehicles was imminent in 1972 and Dahlhausen was still not totally ready, the locomotive shed next to the workshop building of the old Neustadt/Haardt locomotive shed was rented. In 1981 then, the "DGEG Railway Museum of Neustadt/Weinstraße" emerged. Today the Würzburg Railway Museum is also operated by DGEG.

== Collections ==
The society owns by far the largest and most valuable collection of railway vehicles and equipment in Germany. These include:

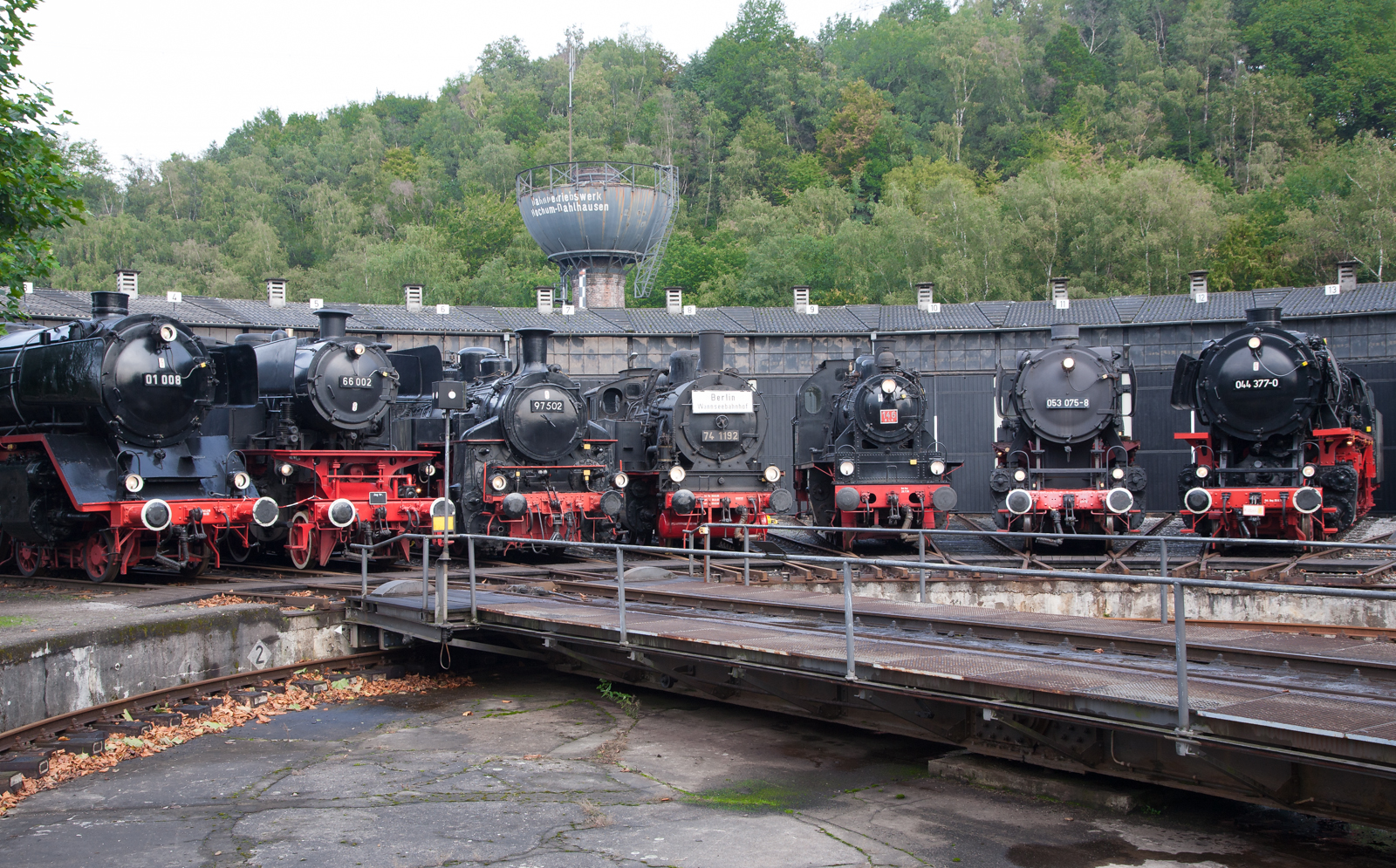
Railway Museum Bochum-Dahlhausen

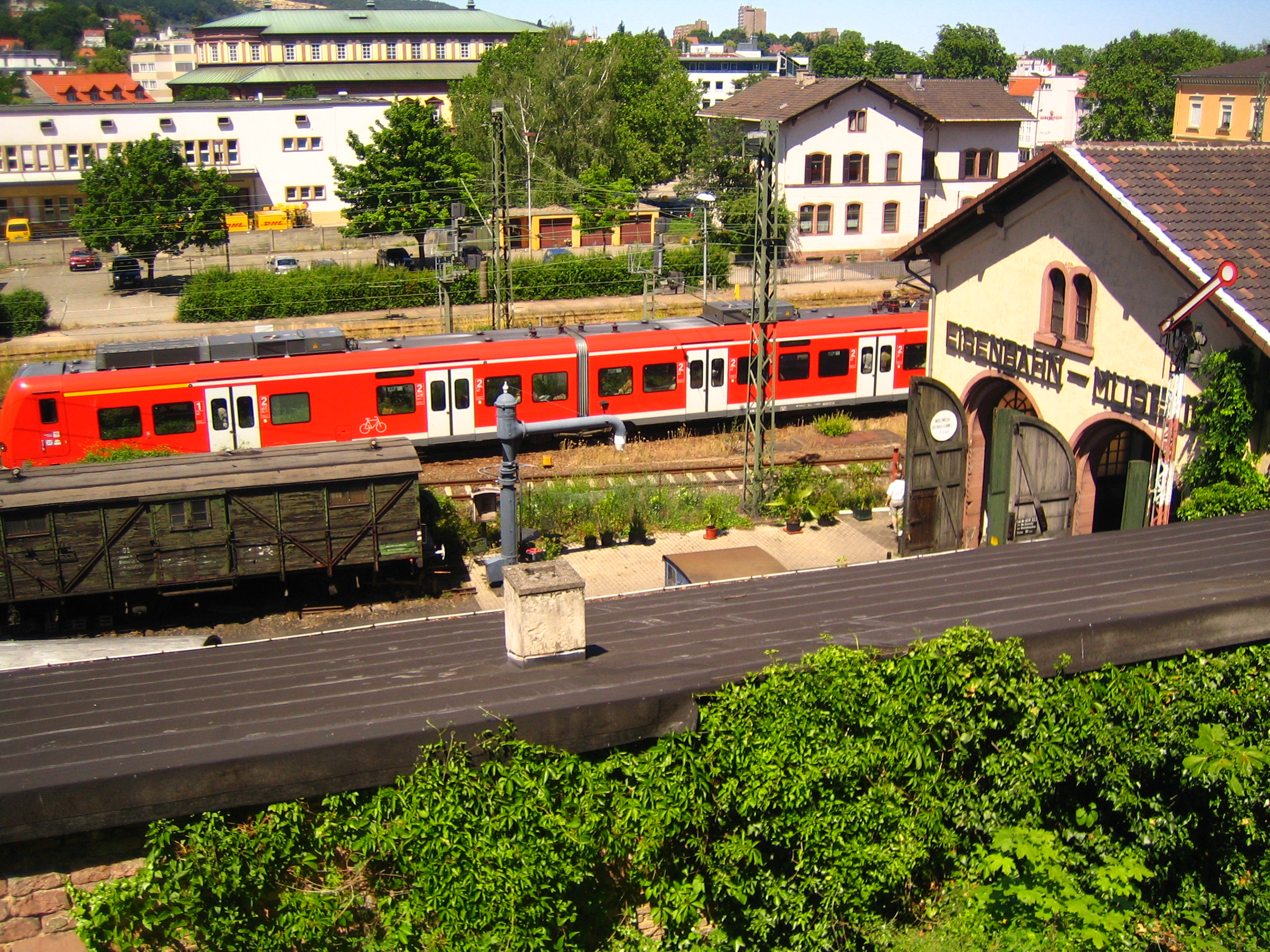
Neustadt Railway Museum

- The Bochum Dahlhausen Railway Museum (Eisenbahnmuseum Bochum-Dahlhausen).
- The Neustadt/Weinstraße Railway Museum (Eisenbahnmuseum Neustadt/Weinstraße), that is located in the immediate vicinity of the main station at Neustadt an der Weinstraße, in its former locomotive shed. The DGEG operates the Little Cuckoo Railway (Kuckucksbähnel) from there, using its own rolling stock.
- The DGEG's Würzburg Railway Museum (Eisenbahnmuseum Würzburg) organises public services and, on request, special services in the Würzburg area with the DRG Class 52 goods train steam locomotive, no. 52 7409, which was built in 1943.

The DGEG also owns a large library (in cooperation with the University Library of Dortmund (Universitätsbibliothek Dortmund) whose books can be loaned through any public library in Germany, and an archive on the subject of railways in Witten. The collection of narrow gauge vehicles was dissolved and museum operations on the Jagsttal line (Jagsttalbahn) had to be given up on the closure of the route.

== Organisation ==
The DGEG has around 2,000 members at present, that in several regions and towns have also formed membership groups. The office is located in Werl.

The museums in Bochum, Neustadt und Würzburg are legally dependent profit centres within the society, the museum in Bochum is still a limited company. Together this forms a charitable setup from which the DGEG can be operated.

In addition to this charitable base, there is a commercial one, that is called the DGEG Holding AG. Included in this holding company are the:

- DGEG Bahnen und Reisen Bochum AG, at the same time a railway services company as defined by the 'General Railway Law' (Allgemeines Eisenbahngesetz).
- DGEG Bahnen und Reisen Neustadt GmbH
- DGEG Bahnen und Reisen Würzburg GmbH
- DGEG-Medien GmbH, a publisher based in Hövelhof, that at the same time issues the membership magazine Eisenbahn Geschichte .

== See also ==
- Bavarian Localbahn Society which came from the DGEG.
- List of DRG locomotives and railbuses
- List of Bavarian locomotives and railbuses
- List of Prussian locomotives and railbuses
