= Gmund am Tegernsee =

Gmund a.Tegernsee
- Municipality
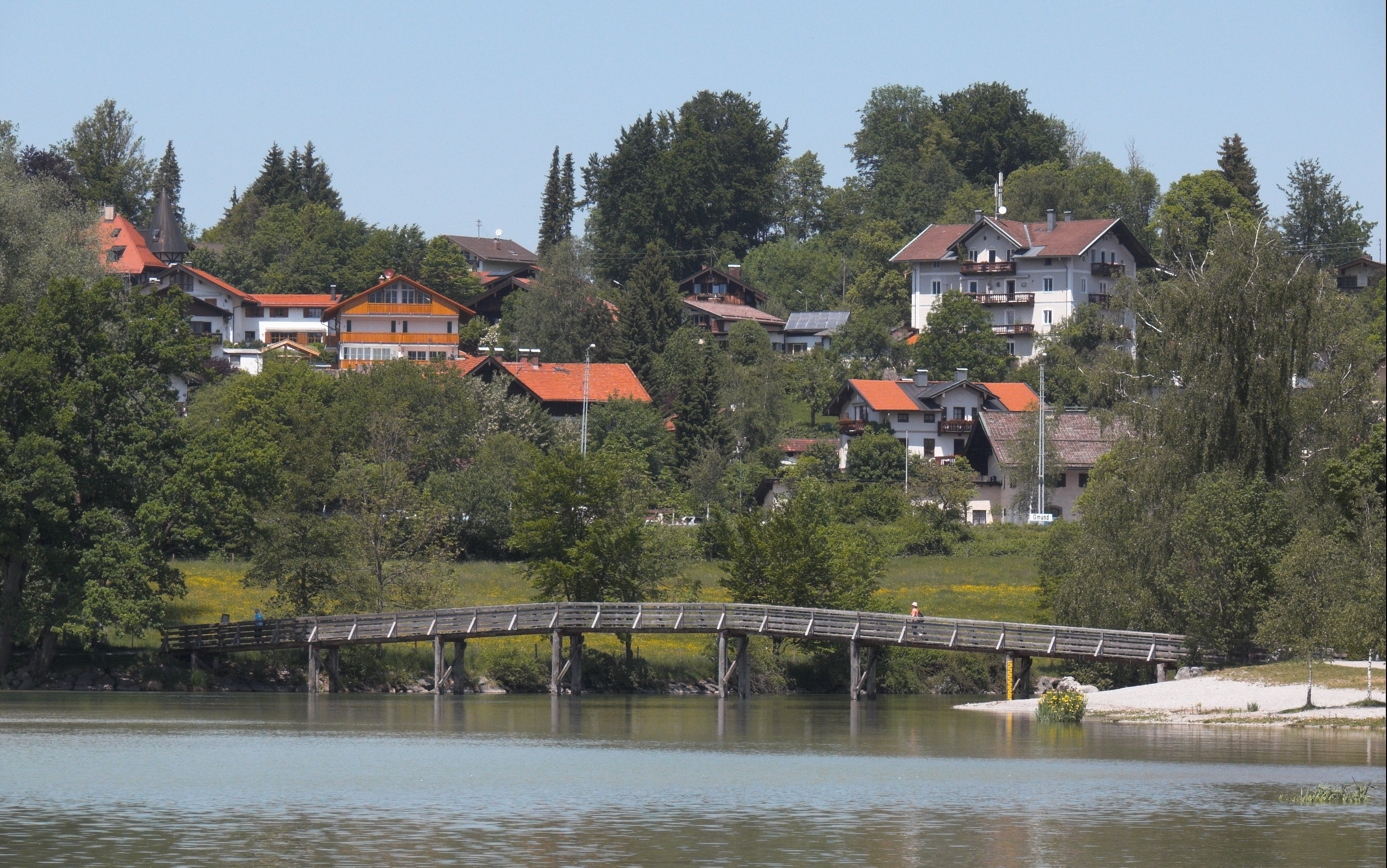
- Gmund am Tegernsee seen from Mangfall River

- Flag Coat of arms

- Location of Gmund a.Tegernsee within Miesbach district
- Interactive map of Gmund a.Tegernsee
- Location within Germany Location within Bavaria
- Coordinates: 47°45′N 11°44′E
- Country: Germany
- State: Bavaria
- Admin. region: Oberbayern
- District: Miesbach

Government
  - Mayor (2024–30): Alfons Besel (FW)

Area
  - Total: 34.40 km^{2} (13.28 sq mi)
- Elevation: 740 m (2,430 ft)

Population (2025-12-31)
  - Total: 5,749
  - Density: 167.1/km^{2} (432.8/sq mi)
- Time zone: UTC+01:00 (CET)
  - Summer (DST): UTC+02:00 (CEST)
- Postal codes: 83703
- Dialling codes: 08022 / 08021
- Vehicle registration: MB
- Website: www.rathaus-gmund.de

Gmund am Tegernsee is a municipality in the district of Miesbach in Bavaria in Germany. The town is located on the north shore of the Tegernsee Lake, and near the source of River Mangfall. It is 46 kilometres (29 mi) from Munich and 15 kilometres (9.3 mi) from the district capital, the town of Miesbach.

Famous personalities who lived in Gmund were the Federal Chancellor of the Federal Republic of Germany Ludwig Erhard, who is buried in Gmund's cemetery, the architect Sep Ruf and the clockmaker Johann Mannhardt. Reichsführer-SS Heinrich Himmler and his family maintained a home there from 1934 to 1945.

Gmund is served by a station on the privately owned Tegernsee-Bahn railway, and is linked to Munich by trains of the Bayerische Oberlandbahn.

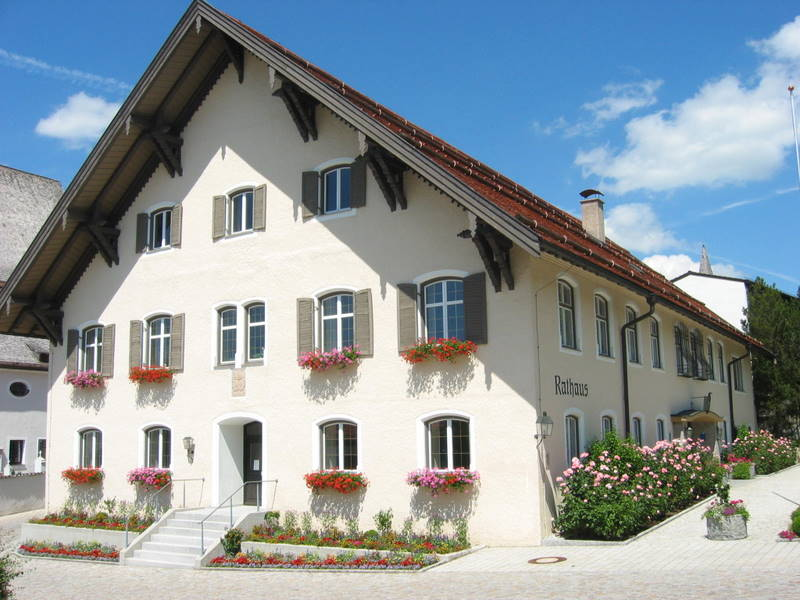
Gmund am Tegernsee Town Hall

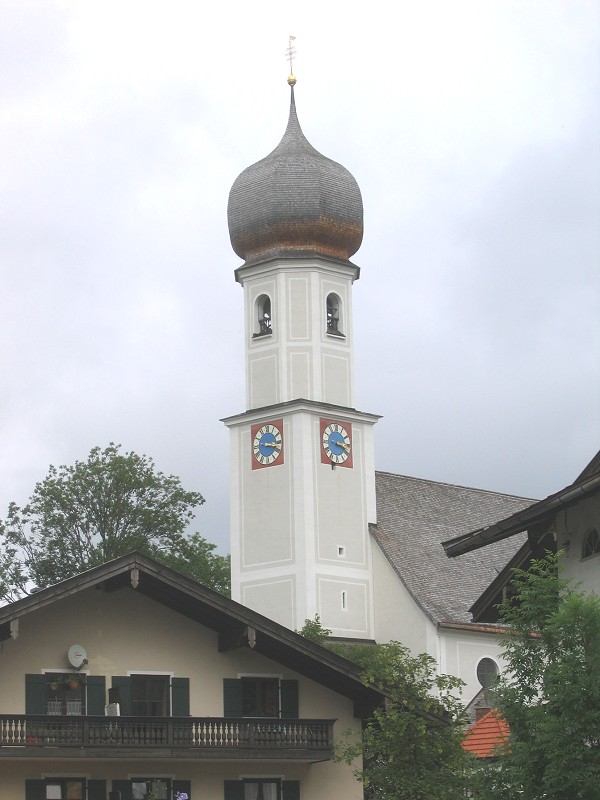
St Aegidius Church

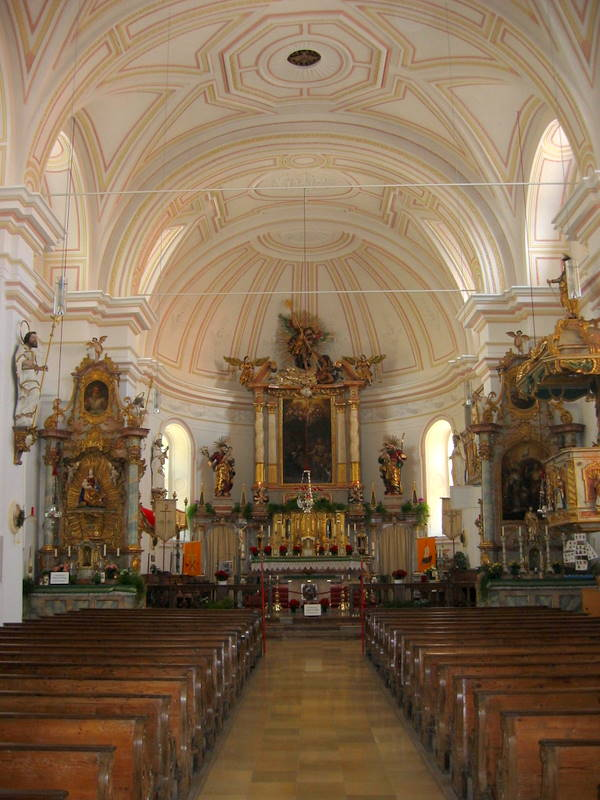
St Aegidius Church interior

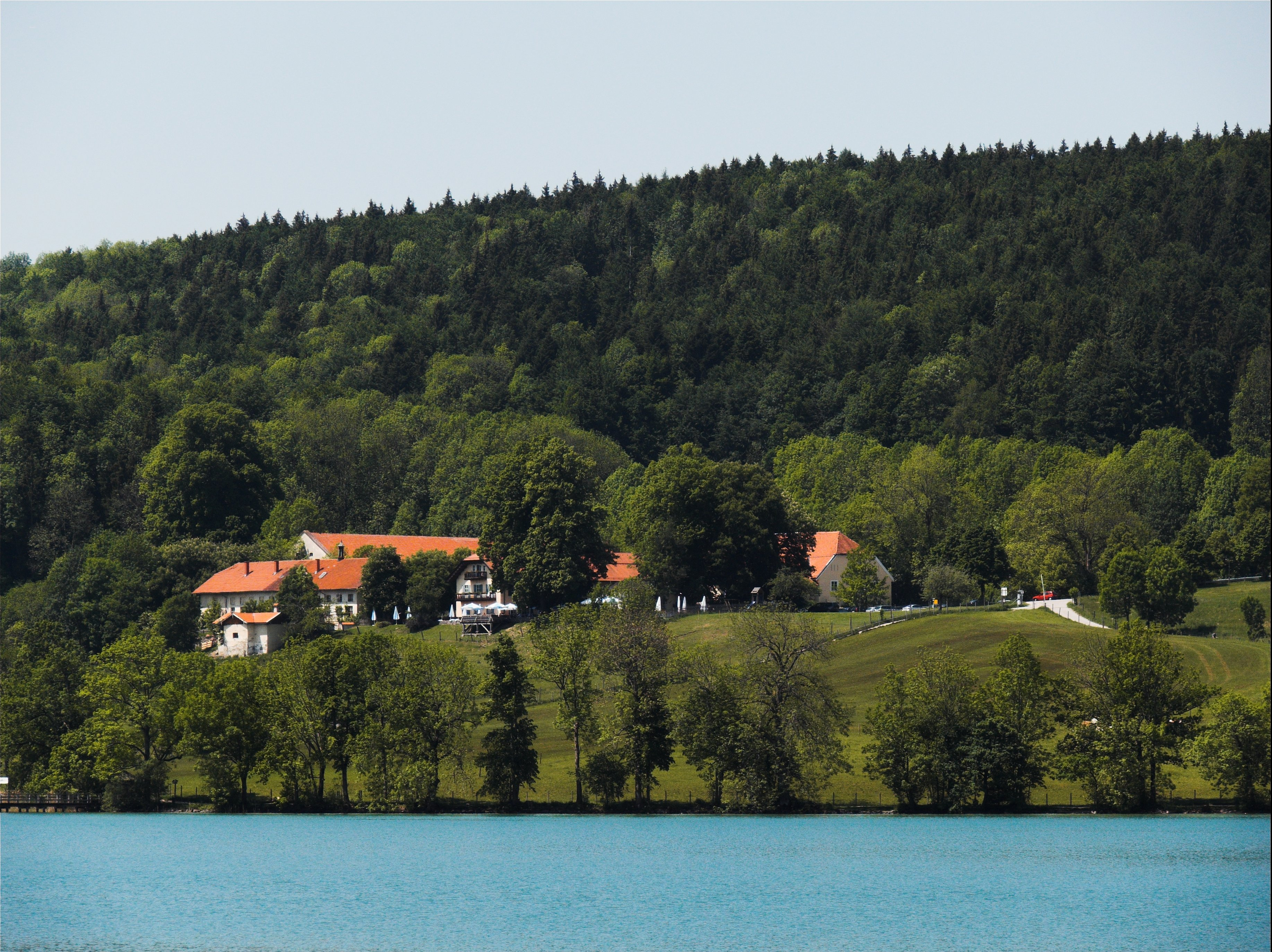
Kaltenbrunn Estate
