= Waakirchen =

- Municipality
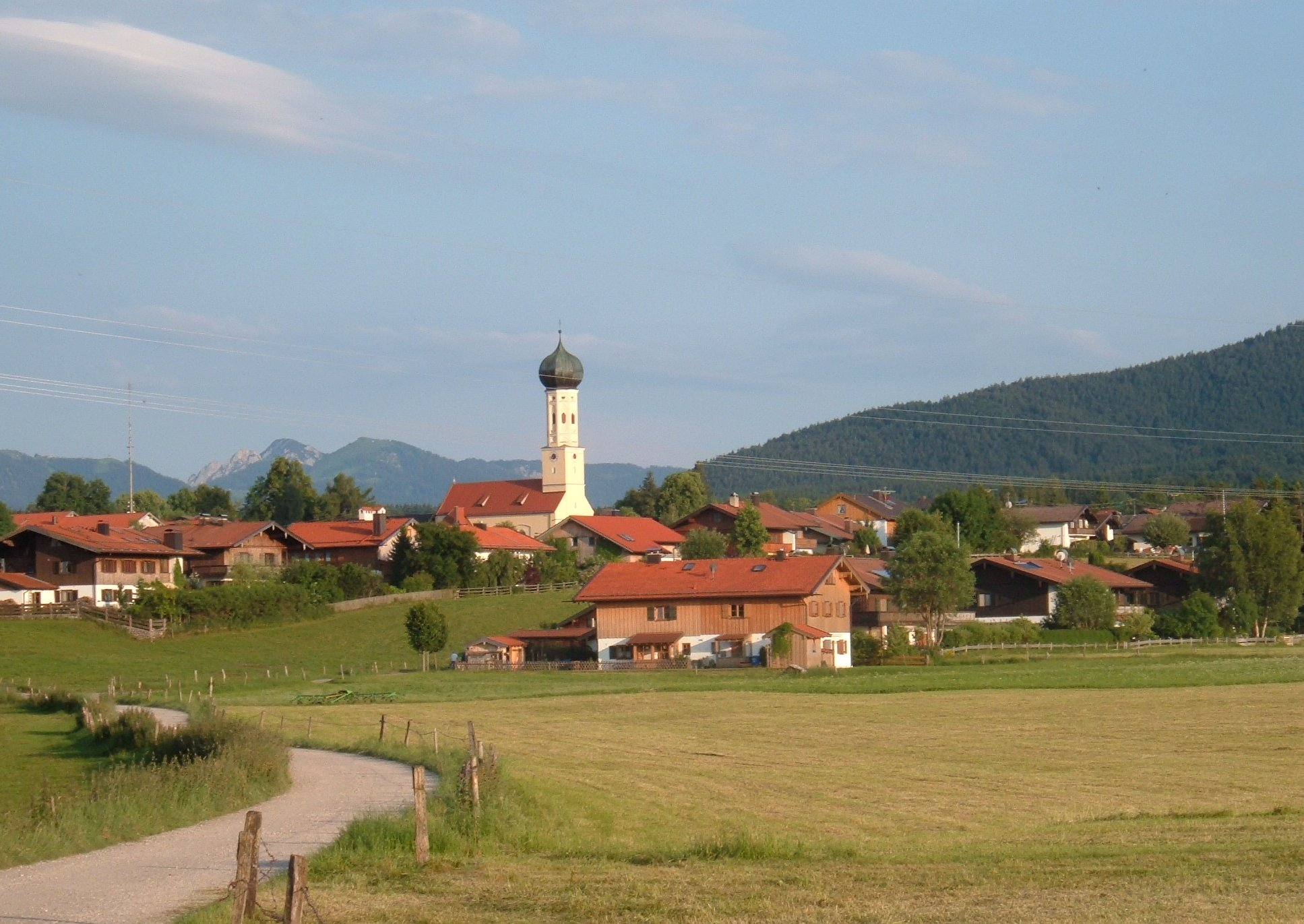
- Waakirchen

- Coat of arms

- Location of Waakirchen within Miesbach district
- Interactive map of Waakirchen
- Location within Germany Location within Bavaria
- Coordinates: 47°46′N 11°40′E
- Country: Germany
- State: Bavaria
- Admin. region: Oberbayern
- District: Miesbach
- Subdivisions: 7 Ortsteile

Government
  - Mayor (2020–26): Norbert Kerkel (FW)

Area
  - Total: 42.32 km^{2} (16.34 sq mi)
- Elevation: 759 m (2,490 ft)

Population (2025-12-31)
  - Total: 5,406
  - Density: 127.7/km^{2} (330.8/sq mi)
- Time zone: UTC+01:00 (CET)
  - Summer (DST): UTC+02:00 (CEST)
- Postal codes: 83666
- Dialling codes: 08021
- Vehicle registration: MB
- Website: www.waakirchen.de

Waakirchen (German pronunciation: [vaːˈkɪʁçn̩]) is a municipality in the district of Miesbach in Bavaria in Germany. At the end of World War II, Japanese American soldiers (Nisei from the 522nd Field Artillery Battalion) rescued concentration camp victims on a death march at this village.
