= TAG Tegernsee Immobilien und Beteiligung =

Property company

TAG Immobilien AG
- Company type: Public (Aktiengesellschaft)
- Traded as: FWB: TEG; MDAX Component
- ISIN: DE0008303504
- Industry: Real estate
- Founded: 1882; 144 years ago
- Headquarters: Hamburg, Germany
- Key people: Claudia Hoyer (Executive Board); Martin Thiel (Executive Board); Olaf Borkers (Chairman of the supervisory board)
- Revenue: ▲€967.5 million (2025)
- Total assets: ▲€8.951 billion (2025)
- Number of employees: ▲1,922 (2025)
- Website: tag-ag.com

TAG Tegernsee Immobilien und Beteiligungs-AG (TAG Tegernsee Property and Holding Company) is a property company from Germany with its head office in Hamburg. Until 1998 as Tegernsee-Bahn (Tegernsee Railway) it operated the railway line from Schaftlach via Gmund to Tegernsee. The company is listed in the share index, MDAX.

== Subsidiaries and holdings ==
TAG Immobilien AG operates as a holding company for a large number of subsidiaries. Key operational units include:

- TAG Wohnen GmbH: The primary management company for the group's residential portfolio.
- TAG Colonia-Immobilien AG: A major subsidiary (approx. 84.1%) focused on residential holdings, formerly known as Colonia Real Estate AG.
- Bau-Verein zu Hamburg Immobilien GmbH: A historic real estate developer in the Hamburg region, fully integrated into the group.
- TAG Handwerkerservice GmbH: Provides facility management and repair services for the group's properties.
- ROBYG S.A.: A significant Polish property developer acquired in 2022 to expand TAG's presence in the Eastern European market.

As of 2025, the group holds interests in over 80 subsidiaries, including various regional housing companies.

== History of the Tegernseebahn ==
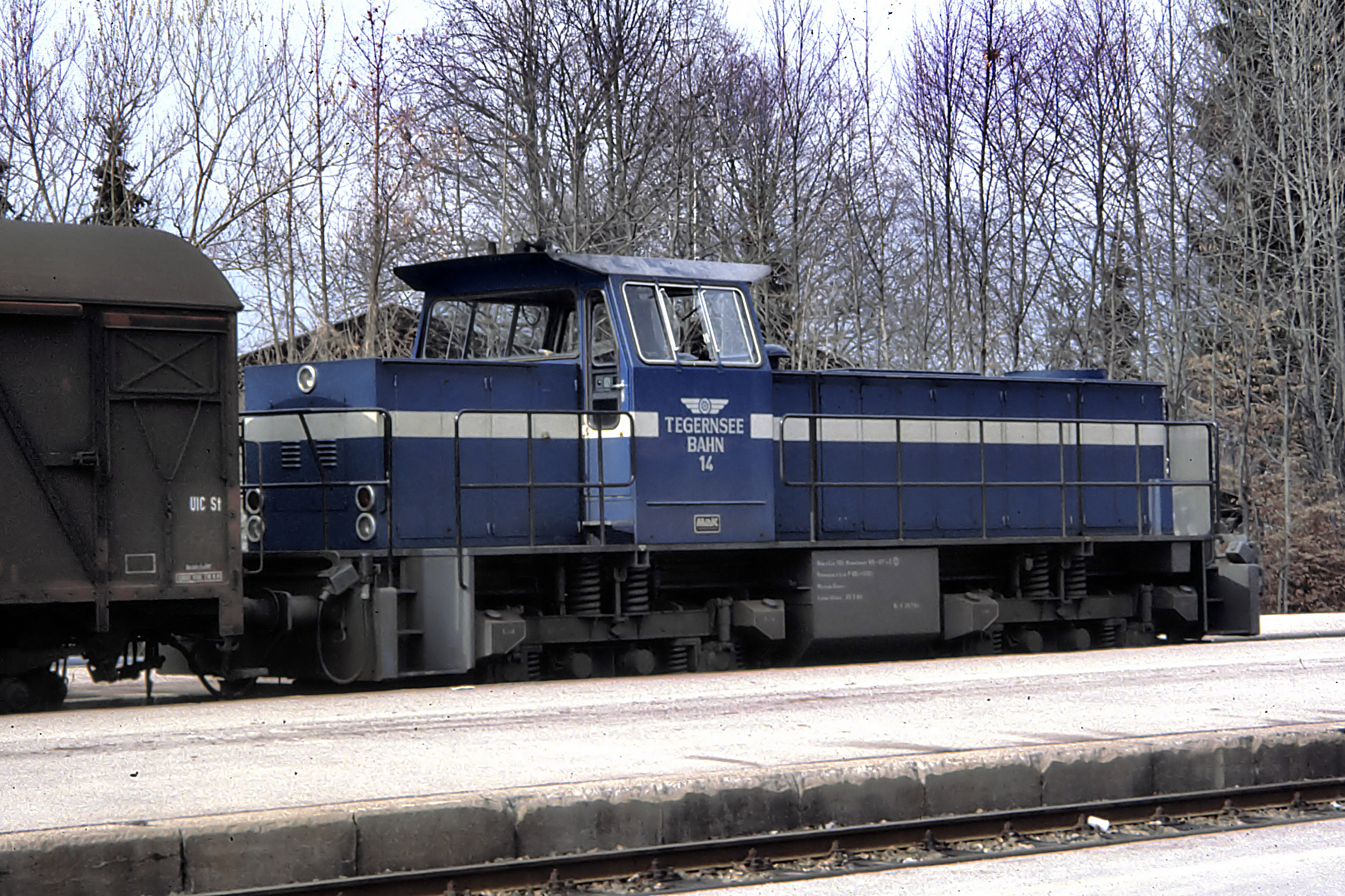
Locomotive no. 14 of the Tegernsee-Bahn AG at Tegernsee

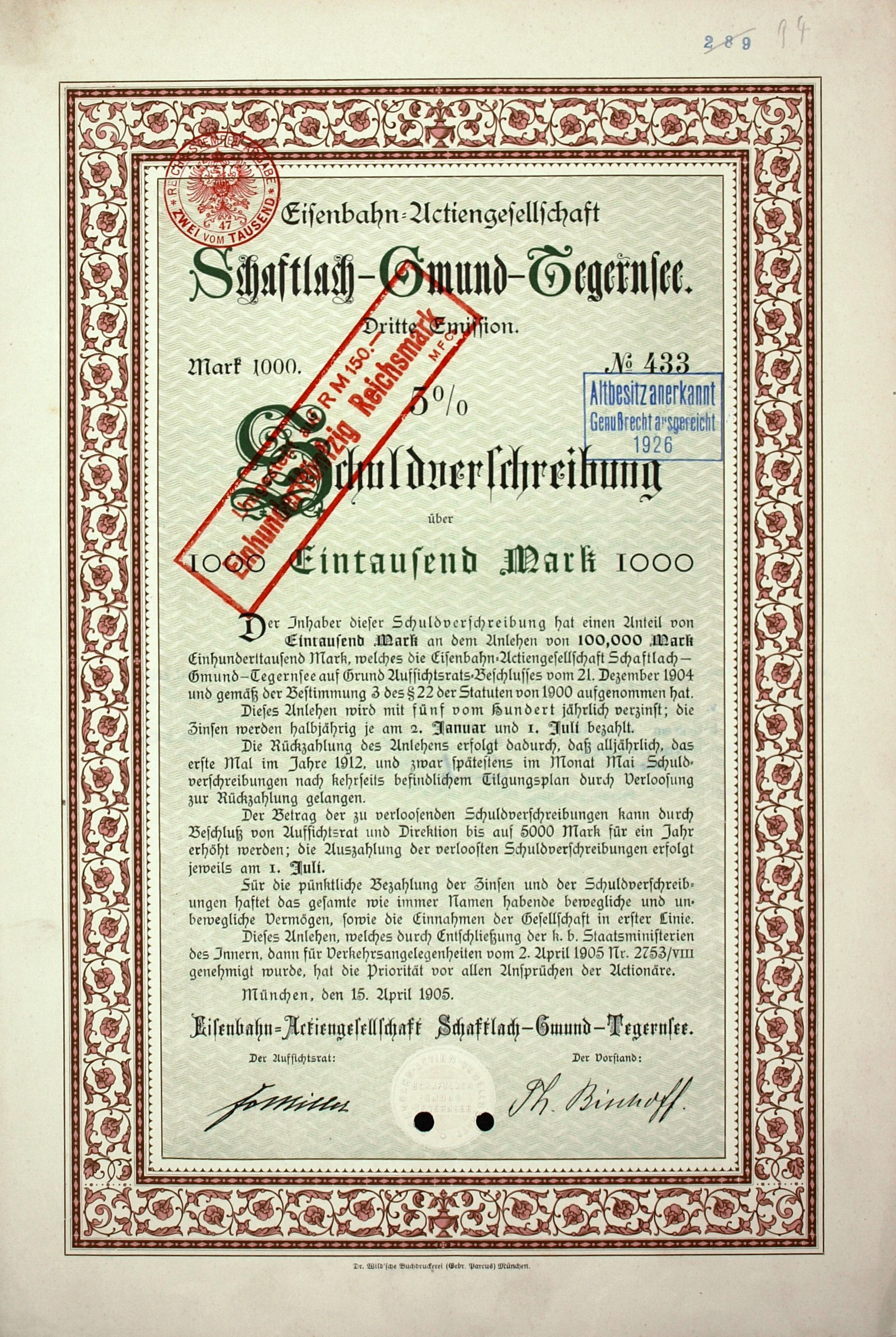
Bond of the Eisenbahn-AG Schaftlach-Gmund-Tegernsee, issued 15. April 1905

The company emerged from what was originally called the Eisenbahn-Actiengesellschaft Schaftlach-Gmund (Schaftlach-Gmund Railway Company Ltd), founded in 1882, which built the 7.6 km long railway line between these villages. It is suspected that Ferdinand von Miller, amongst others, played a decisive role. From 1896 the line was extended by 4.8 km to Tegernsee; in 1902 the first train ran to Tegernsee and the company was renamed the Eisenbahn-Actiengesellschaft Schaftlach-Gmund-Tegernsee or EAG (Schaftlach-Gmund-Tegernsee Railway Company Ltd). In 1942 the name was shortened to Tegernsee-Bahn Aktiengesellschaft (Tegernsee Railway Company Ltd) and, in 1983, running powers were transferred to the new subsidiary Tegernsee-Bahn Betriebsgesellschaft mbH or TBG (Tegernsee Railway Operating Company Ltd).

The operation of the line has been rented out since 1998 for 15 years to the Bayerische Oberlandbahn (BOB), that previously had the state concession for the operation of railway services in the Bavarian Oberland. The BOB has continued to use the railway infrastructure of the Tegernsee-Bahn. The running and rolling stock was given up by the Tegernsee-Bahn in 1999 as they no longer needed it. Since 2002 the TBG has once again had its own locomotive, the TAG 15. This former DB Class Köf III is used for snow plough runs and construction train work.

The Tegernsee-Bahn Betriebsgesellschaft is a member of the Fare Association of Federal and Private Railways in Germany (Tarifverband der Bundeseigenen und Nichtbundeseigenen Eisenbahnen in Deutschland or TBNE).

== History of the property and holding company ==
Following the cessation of its railway operation in 1998, as a result of the concession being given to a competitor, the business of the TAG AG became limited to the maintenance and rental of property and land that belonged to the railway (trackage, stations at Gmund and Tegernsee) as well as land no longer needed for railway operations and the cash assets. An investors group including investor, Rolf Hauschildt, and property manager, Lutz Ristow, initially took over a share and posts on the board of directors; later Ristow was also the Vorstandsmandat for a short time. The firm was reorganised into a property and holding company, and was renamed in 1999 to TAG Tegernsee Immobilien und Beteiligungs-AG. In January 2001, as part of its expansion into property, the TAG bought 75% of the non-public Berliner JUS AG, which had specialised in refurbishing and modernising property under historical protection orders. Its manager, Michael Haupt, joined the TAG's board. Its share was increased in 2002 to 94%. In June 2001, 44% of the public Bau-Verein zu Hamburg AG was bought; through a swap action and further purchase its share rose in early 2002 to 88%, but fell again afterwards to today's 69%. Likewise, in 2001 the non-public project development and preservation company AGP AG Munich was taken over. In November 2002, the Real Immobilien GmbH was founded, together with a subsidiary, Sachsen LB, into which properties in need of repair were bundled.

== See also ==
TAG 7, a historic locomotive from the Tegernsee-Bahn
