= Pullach station =

Railway station in Germany

Pullach
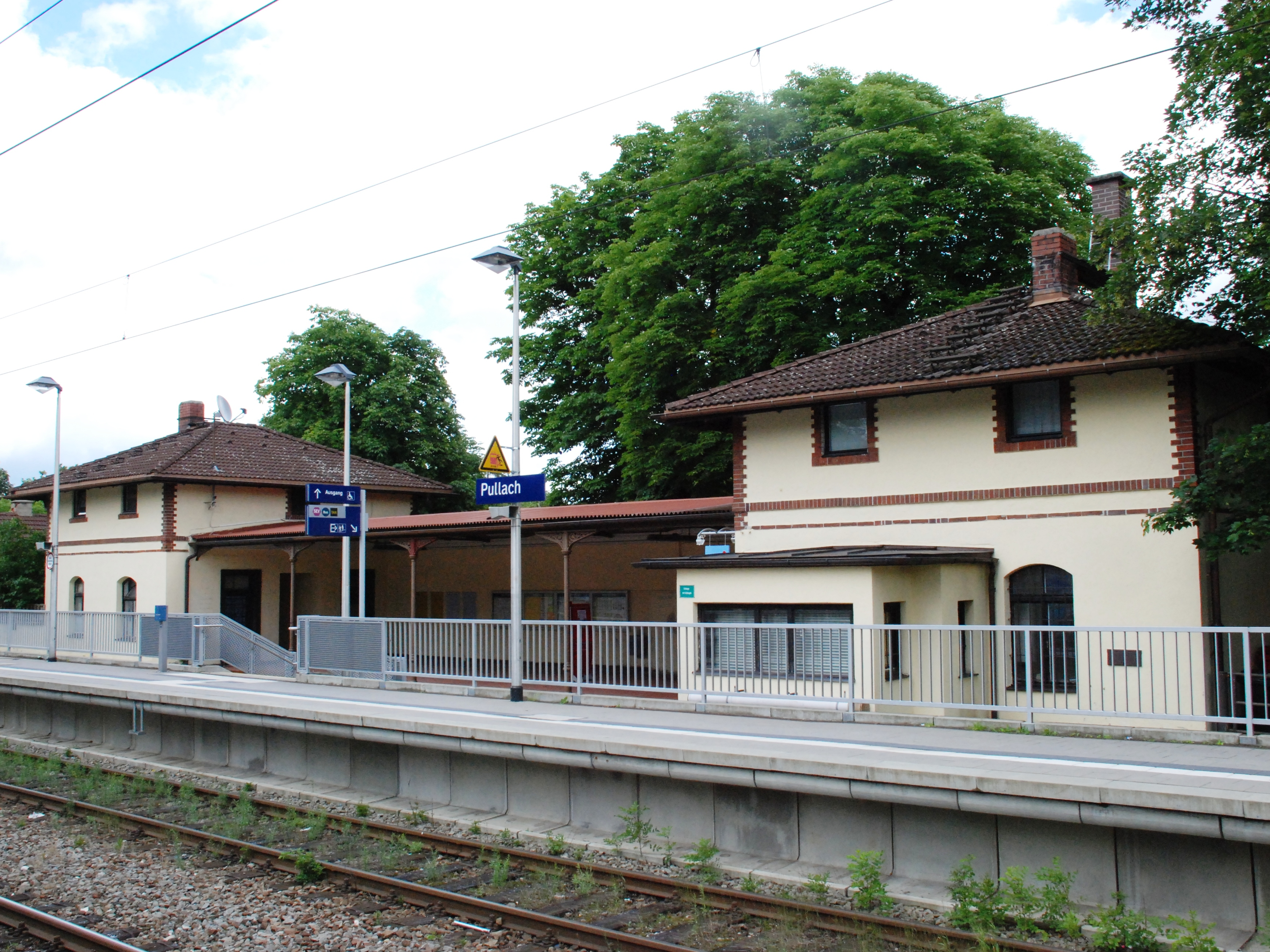

General information
- Location: Pullach im Isartal, Bavaria; Germany
- Coordinates: 48°03′31″N 11°31′19″E
- Owner: Deutsche Bahn
- Operator: DB Netz; DB Station&Service
- Line: Munich–Bichl (km 7.4)
- Platforms: 2
- Train operators: S-Bahn München
- Connections: 270

Construction
- Accessible: Yes

Other information
- Station code: 5057
- DS100 code: MPUL
- IBNR: 8004899
- Category: 6
- Fare zone: : M and 1
- Website: stationsdatenbank.de; www.bahnhof.de

History
- Opened: 1891

Services
Preceding station	Munich S-Bahn	Following station
Höllriegelskreuth towards Wolfratshausen	S7	Grosshesselohe Isartal towards München Hbf
Höllriegelskreuth Terminus	S20	Grosshesselohe Isartal towards Geltendorf
Location
- Location within Bavaria Location within Germany Location within Europe

Pullach station is a station on the Isar Valley Railway from Munich to Bichl in the German state of Bavaria. It has been part of the Munich S-Bahn since 1981. The station is located in the municipality of Pullach, which also contains the stations of Großhesselohe Isartal and Höllriegelskreuth. It is classified by Deutsche Bahn as a category 6 station and has two platforms. The station building is registered as a historic building on the List of Bavarian Monuments and has been acquired by the municipality of Pullach, which operates it.

== Location ==
Pullach station is located at Bahnhofstraße 10 in the municipality of Pullach between federal highway 11 and the high banks of the Isar River. At both ends of the station there are level crossings; the level crossing barriers are to be renewed and fully automated in April 2013. Two underpasses were planned years ago, but these plans have since been abandoned due to concerns about their impact on the local landscape.

== History ==
The Isar Valley Railway opened from Thalkirchen to Ebenhausen on 10 June 1891 and it was extended to Wolfratshausen on 27 July. Initially, there was a railway station in Pullach, which was known as Isartalbahnhof (station of the Isar Valley Railway) because it was served by trains running on the Isar Valley Railway. Duplication of the track from the station of the Isar Valley Railway (Isartalbahnhof) in Munich to Höllriegelskreuth was completed on 23 December 1897. Pullach station consequently had three tracks, with tracks 2 and 3 being used by passenger trains. Track 1, next to the station building, was used mainly for freight and was equipped with a loading siding and a small freight shed. The station was electrified on 15 January 1900, alongside the Munich-Isartalbahnhof–Höllriegelskreuth section of the Isar Valley Railway. In 1944, Pullach station was served by 44 commuter trains, mostly suburban services between Munich Isartalbahnhof and Höllriegelskreuth. In 1973, the station facilities were rebuilt for its integration into the Munich S-Bahn network and one track was demolished. The remaining two side platforms were raised to a height of 76 centimetres. After the renovation, the station was served every 30 minutes by locomotive-hauled suburban trains, S-Bahn line 10, running between Munich Central Station (Hauptbahnhof) and Wolfratshausen. Since 31 May 1981, the station has been served every 20 minutes by electric multiple units on line S7; this was made possible by the construction of the southern lines tunnel (Südstreckentunnel).

== Operations ==
The station has two side platforms that are 140 metres long and 96 cm high. There are level crossings situated at both ends of the platforms. The S-Bahn station is served by S-Bahn lines S7 from Wolfratshausen to Kreuzstraße every 20 minutes and S20 from Höllriegelskreuth to Pasing hourly from Monday and Friday.

== Station building ==
The single-storey station building is located between two two-storey pavilions. The station building's pavilions are plastered buildings with exposed brick decor and have hip roofs; the middle part has a flat roof. The platform hall is situated between the pavilions, which is aligned next to the platform. It is supported by three cast iron pillars. The station building is registered as a historic building on the List of Bavarian Monuments.

== Sources ==
- Georg Paula, Timm Weski (1994). "Landkreis München". In Bayerisches Landesamt für Denkmalpflege (ed.). Denkmäler in Bayern: Kreisfreie Städte und Landkreise (in German). Vol. I.17. Munich: Karl M. Lipp Verlag. p. 232. ISBN 3-87490-576-4.
- Claus-Jürgen Schulze (1978). Die Isartalbahn (in German). Munich: Bufe-Fachbuchverlag. ISBN 3-922138-04-7.
