= München Süd station =

Railway station in Germany

Coordinates: 48°07′20″N 11°33′09″E

München Süd
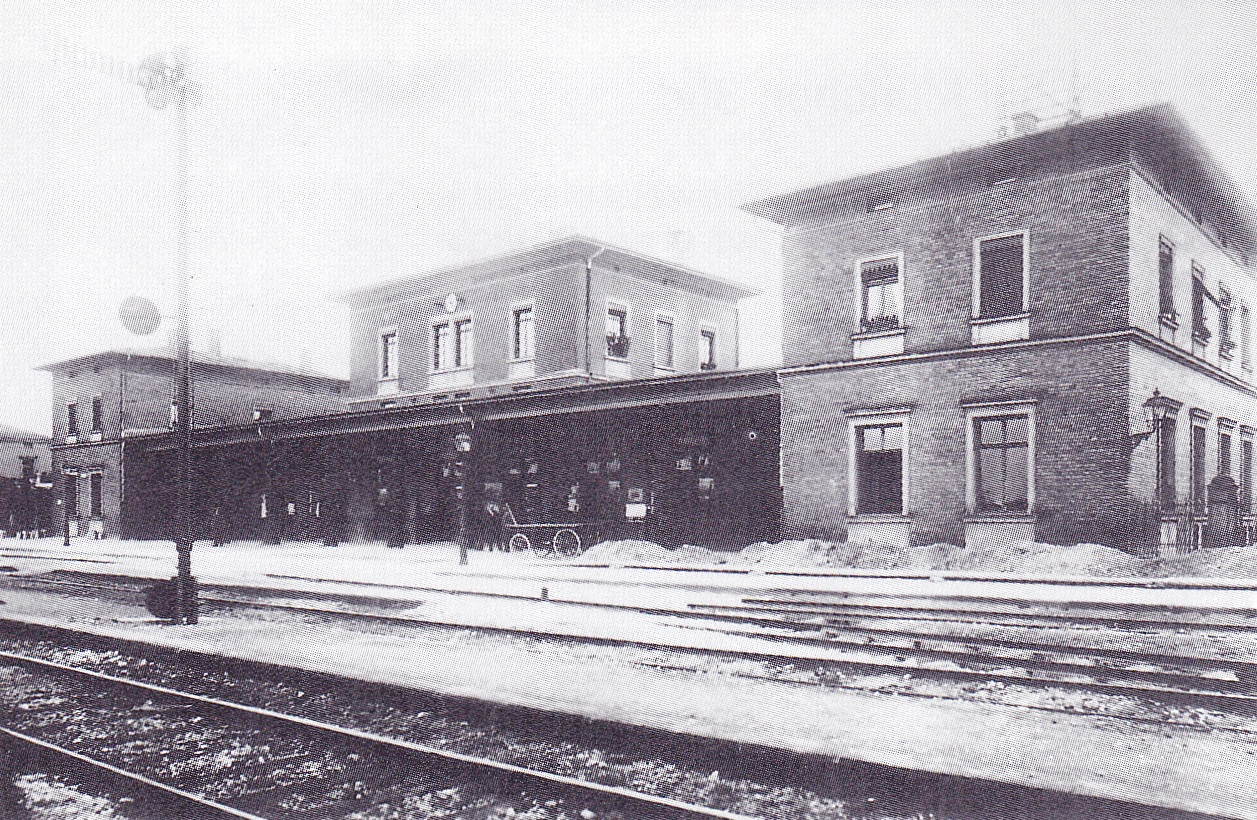

General information
- Location: Munich, Bavaria; Germany
- Lines: Munich South Ring; Isar Valley Railway

History
- Opened: 1 May 1871; 155 years ago
- Closed: 1 June 1985; 41 years ago
- Electrified: 3 January 1927; 99 years ago

Key dates
- 1985: Railway station closed
- 2005: Station buildings demolished
Location
- Location within Bavaria

München Süd (Munich South station) is a disused railway station and a railway goods station in the Munich borough of Ludwigsvorstadt-Isarvorstadt. The train services were withdrawn on 1 July 1985. In 2005, the last buildings were demolished to make room for office buildings.

The station is located on the South Ring (Südring), connecting Munich Central Station with Munich East. The public transport is now handled by Poccistraße Munich U-Bahn station, located to the west of the old railway station. The Isar Valley Railway used to start at the Südbahnhof, going via München Isartalbahnhof (Munich Isar Valley station) and Großhesselohe Isartalbahnhof railway station towards Wolfratshausen and Bichl.

During the planning studies for the second Munich S-Bahn Stammstrecke route, one of the several routes considered was the South Ring. However, the South Ring concept was abandoned as it was deemed to be "inefficient" in terms of travel time between Munich Hauptbahnhof and Munich Ostbahnhof due to S-Bahn trains stopping at Hauptbahnhof then reverse its direction toward the South Ring or western destinations.

When the Munich city council and state government of Bavaria approved the construction of new Munich U-Bahn U9/U29 bypass line in 2019, one of the proposed concepts was building a new "superstation" combining the U-Bahn, S-Bahn, and regional train services to be built at South Ring and Lindwurmstraße. The plan called for the closure of the current Poccistraße and Implerstraße subway stations and construction of a new four-track station underneath the Südring, serving the U3, U9, and U29, and connecting to the new aboveground station serving regional trains and possibly the S-Bahn if the future S-Bahn-Ring is approved. The new U-Bahn station would be called Impler-/Poccistraße to differentiate it from the current U3/U6 – Implerstraße and Poccistraße stations. If the aboveground station is constructed, no official name, be it Münchner Südbahnhof or Impler-/Poccistraße Bahnhof, has been assigned.
