= Höllriegelskreuth station =

Railway station in Germany

Höllriegelskreuth
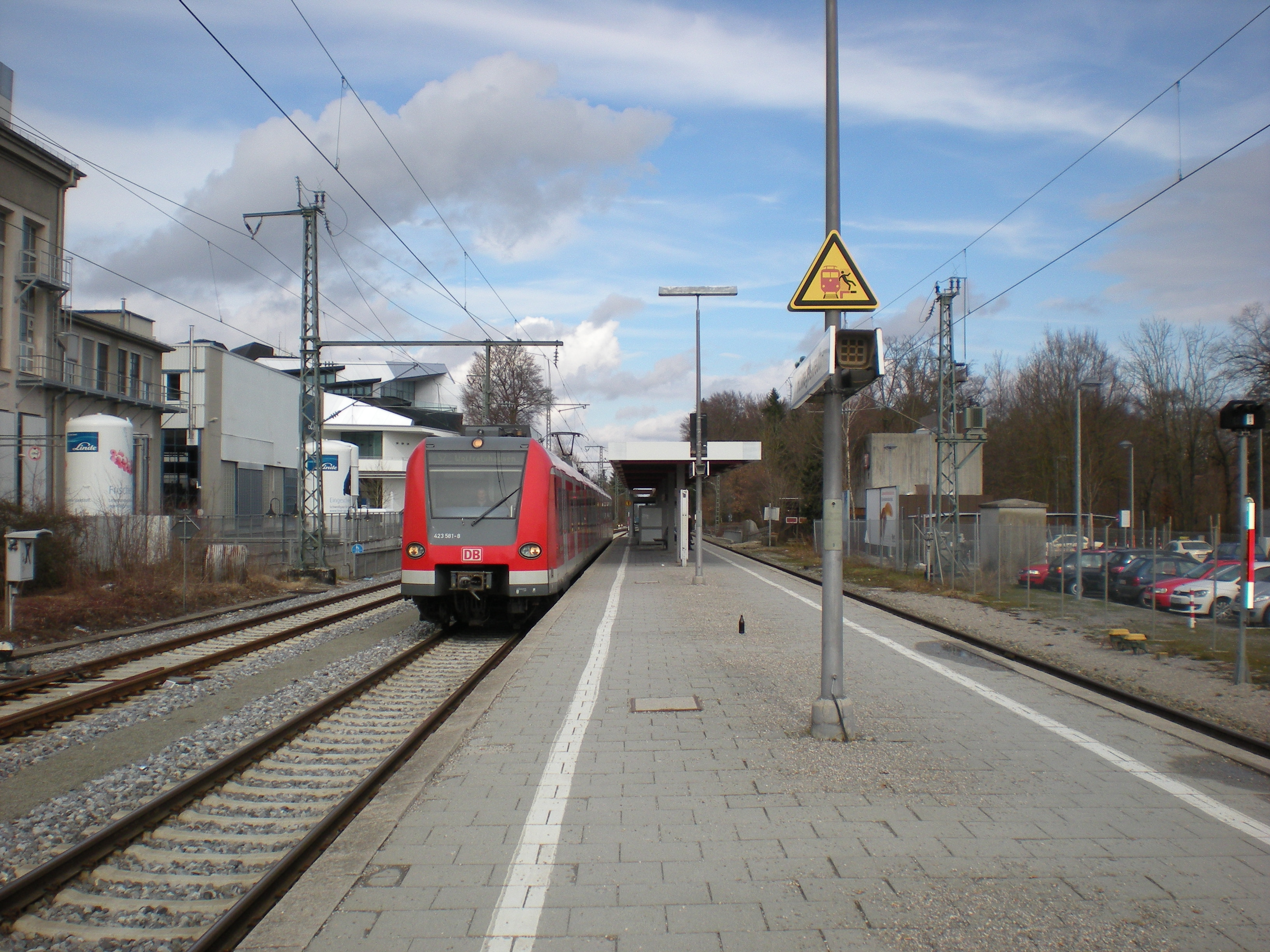

General information
- Location: Zugspitzstraße 2; 82049 Pullach; Bavaria; Germany
- Coordinates: 48.043445°N 11.509746°E
- Owner: Deutsche Bahn
- Operator: DB Netz; DB Station&Service
- Line: Isar Valley Railway
- Platforms: 2
- Tracks: 2
- Train operators: S-Bahn München
- Connections: 222, 270, 271

Other information
- Station code: 2876
- DS100 code: MHRK
- IBNR: 8002899
- Category: 6
- Fare zone: : M and 1
- Website: www.bahnhof.de

History
- Opened: 10 July 1891

Services
| Preceding station | Munich S-Bahn | Following station |
|---|---|---|
| Buchenhain towards Wolfratshausen | S7 | Pullach towards München Hbf |
| Terminus | S20 | Pullach towards Geltendorf |
Location
- Location within Bavaria Location within Germany Location within Europe

Höllriegelskreuth station is a railway station on the Munich S-Bahn in the district of Höllriegelskreuth, the industrial and business area of Pullach in the south area of Munich, Germany. It is served by the S-Bahn line S7 and S20.

== History ==
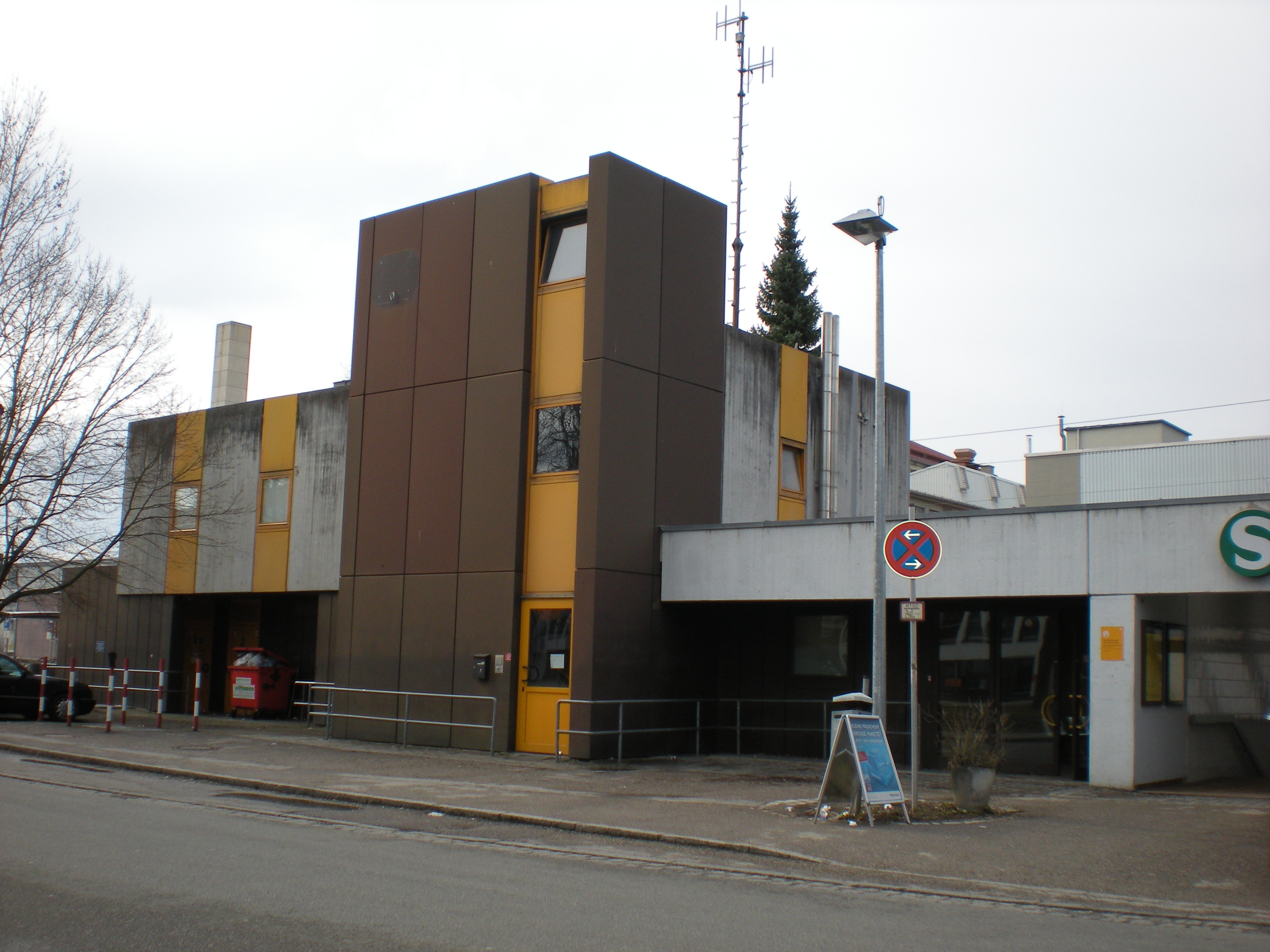
Reception building of 1978 in 2013.

Höllriegelskreuth station - until 22 May 1977 called Höllriegelskreuth-Grünwald - had four tracks, one of them was used for freight transport. Since the electrification the station was the final stop of the electric motor coaches which circulated every 20 minutes. For this purpose, a separate locomotive shed, which was connected with other storage sidings, was established. Even before the introduction of the S-Bahn operation, the demolition of the building took place. In 1978, Deutsche Bundesbahn tore down the old reception building and replaced it with a new building.
