= Grosshesselohe Isartal station =

Railway station in Germany

Großhesselohe Isartalbahnhof
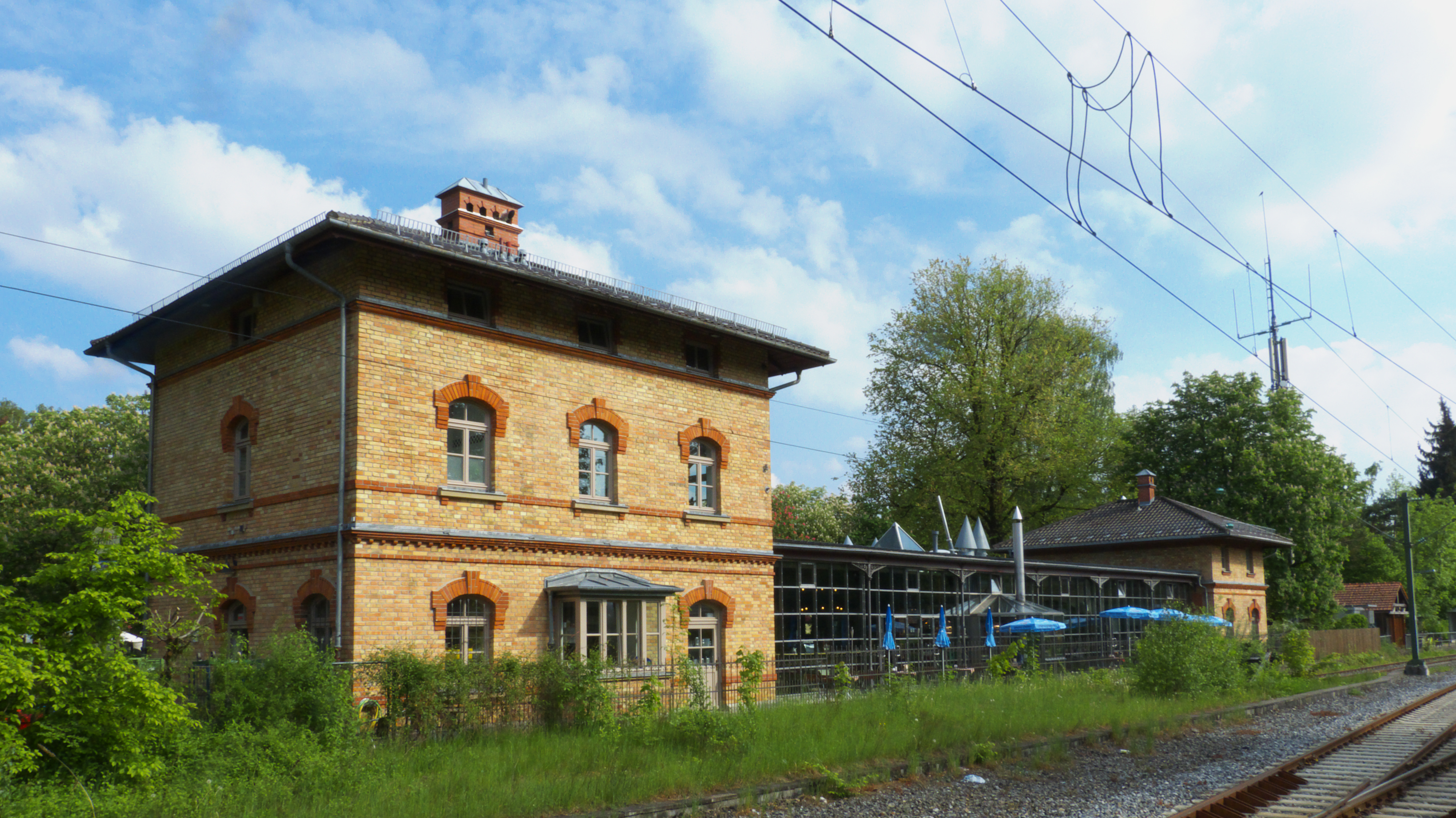
- The former station building in May 2015

General information
- Location: Sollner Str., Pullach im Isartal, Bavaria; Germany
- Coordinates: 48°04′16″N 11°31′51″E
- Line: Munich–Bichl (km 5.9)
- Platforms: 2
- Connections: 270

Construction
- Accessible: Yes

Other information
- Station code: 2349
- DS100 code: MGOI
- IBNR: 8000119
- Category: 5
- Fare zone: : M and 1
- Website: www.bahnhof.de; stationsdatenbank.de

History
- Opened: 1891

Services
Preceding station	Munich S-Bahn	Following station
Pullach towards Wolfratshausen	S7	Munich-Solln towards München Hbf
Pullach towards Höllriegelskreuth	S20	Munich-Solln towards Geltendorf
Location
- Location within Bavaria Location within Germany Location within Europe

Großhesselohe Isartalbahn station (German: Großhesselohe Isartalbahnhof) is a station on the Isar Valley Railway from Munich to Bichl in the German state of Bavaria. Since 1981, it has been a station of the Munich S-Bahn. The station is located in the municipality of Pullach, which also contains the stations of Pullach and Höllriegelskreuth. It is classified by Deutsche Bahn as a category 5 station and has two platform tracks. The station building is registered as a historic building on the List of Bavarian Monuments.

== Location ==
The station is located at Kreuzeckstraße 23-25 in the district of Großhesselohe in the municipality Pullach about 100 metres east of the border with the district of Solln of the city of Munich. Approximately 500 metres north of the station, the Munich–Holzkirchen railway branches off the Isar Valley Railway from München Solln station to Großhesselohe Bridge.

== History ==
The Isar Valley Railway opened from Thalkirchen to Ebenhausen on 10 June 1891 and it was extended to Wolfratshausen on 27 July. From the beginning there was a railway station in Großhesselohe, which was known as the Großhesselohe Isartalbahnhof (station of the Isar Valley Railway) because it was served by trains running on the Isar Valley Railway.

Just north of the Großhesselohe Isartalbahnhof, the Isar Valley Railway was crossed by the Munich–Holzkirchen railway, then part of the Bavarian Maximilian's Railway (Maximiliansbahn), which ran from Solln station to the Großhesselohe Bridge, a 39-metre long iron girder bridge; the original bridge was the second highest bridge in the world when it opened in 1857. West of the bridge was the now closed Großhesselohe State station (Großhesselohe Staatsbahnhof). The railway bridge still exists today and, like the Isartalbahn station, is a listed building.

In 1938, an additional connecting curve was opened from Solln station so that Großhesselohe Isartalbahn station was also linked to the Maximilian's Railway. This connection, however, was initially only used for freight, until 1950, when passenger services also used it. The station was used as a location in the 1963 war film The Great Escape.

In 1964, the section of the Isar Valley Railway between Großhesselohe and Sendling was closed.

In 1981, the station was converted into a S-Bahn station, which did not require the retention of the old station building. The curve from Solln station was duplicated and rebuilt as a grade-separated connection with the Munich–Holzkirchen railway.

== Operations ==
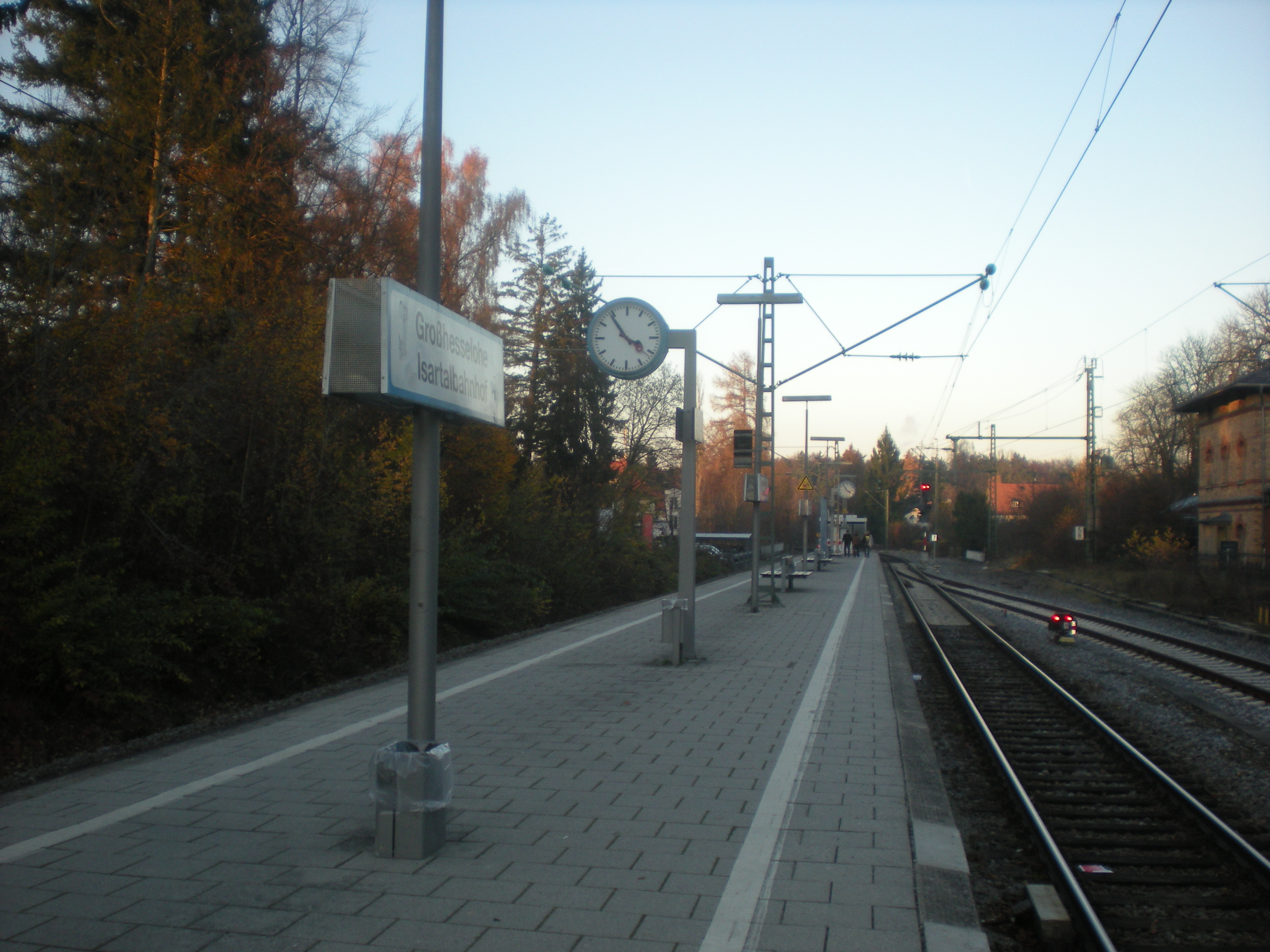
The S-Bahn platform in November 2012

The station has two platform tracks next to a central platform, which is 145 metres long and 76 cm high and is accessible from both sides, but is not accessible for the disabled. The S-Bahn station is served by lines S 7 from Wolfratshausen to Kreuzstraße every 20 minutes and by some S 20 peak hour services from Höllriegelskreuth to Munich-Pasing from Monday and Friday.

== Station building ==
The former station building consists of two rectangular corner pavilions, which were of different sizes and different heights, with a central section connecting them. The corner pavilions are two-story brick buildings of red and yellow bricks and have a tented roof. The single storey connecting building was originally the platform hall and its outer (eastern) side was also made of brick. The originally open western side, next to the platform, is now enclosed with a steel and glass structure.

The middle connecting building now houses the brewery of the Isarbräu white beer brewery (Weißbierbrauerei Isarbräu) and its restaurant. The old platform serves as the terrace of the restaurant and a beer garden has been established in front of the station building.

The asymmetrical layout of the station building was characteristic of the early stations of the Isar Valley. Today it can only be seen elsewhere at Ebenhausen-Schäftlarn station. Pullach station shows a strong contrast even in the originally open platform area.
