= Ebenhausen-Schäftlarn station =

Railway station in Germany

Ebenhausen-Schäftlarn
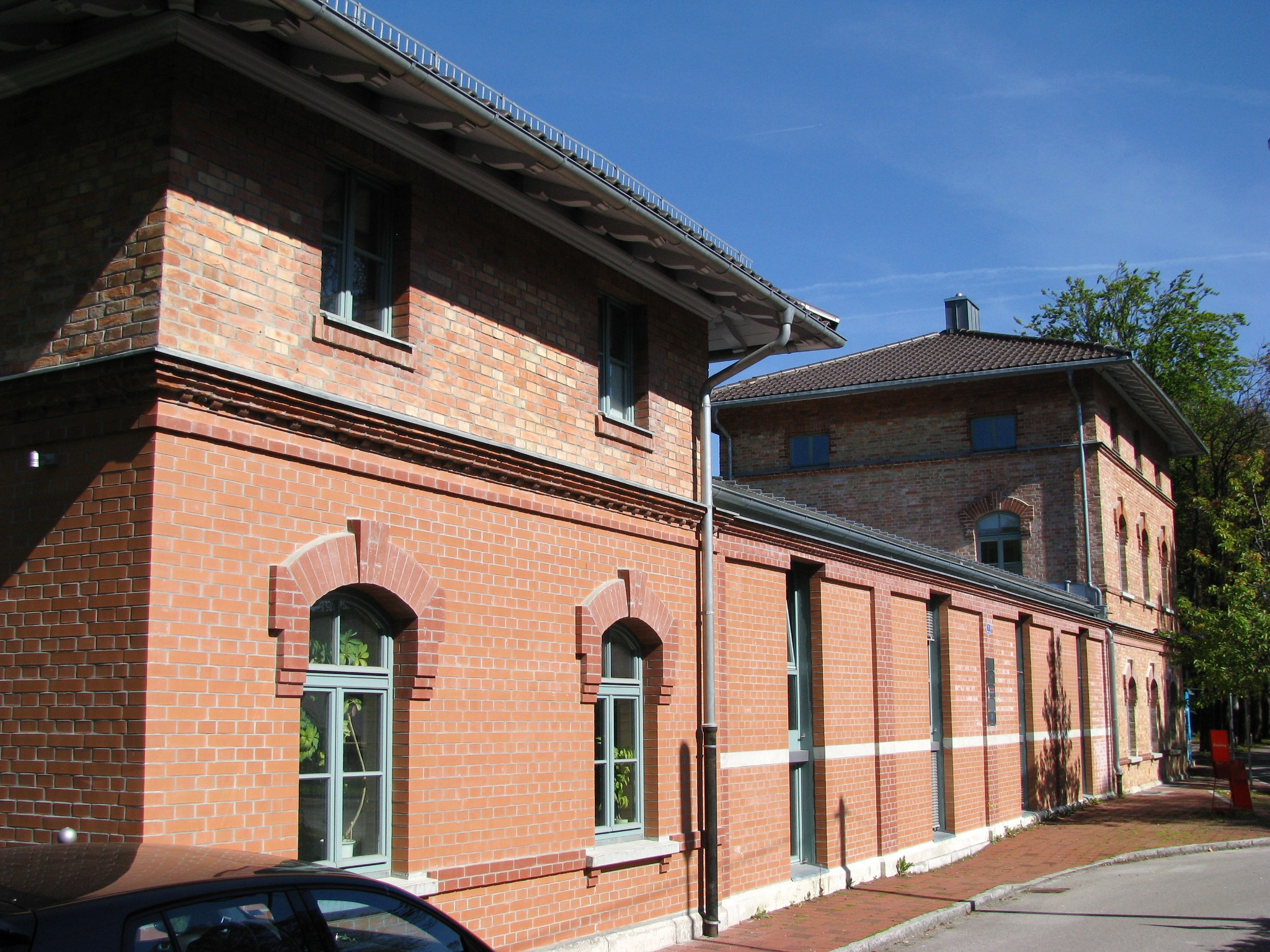

General information
- Location: Poststr. 1, Schäftlarn, Bavaria; Germany
- Coordinates: 47°58′44″N 11°27′17″E
- Owner: DB Netz
- Operator: DB Station&Service
- Line: Munich–Bichl (km 18.5)
- Platforms: 1 island platform
- Tracks: 2
- Train operators: S-Bahn München
- Connections: 974

Construction
- Accessible: No
- Architectural style: Renaissance revival

Other information
- Station code: 1429
- DS100 code: MEBS
- IBNR: 8001621
- Category: 6
- Fare zone: : 1 and 2
- Website: www.bahnhof.de; stationsdatenbank.de

History
- Opened: 1891

Services
Preceding station	Munich S-Bahn	Following station
Icking towards Wolfratshausen	S7	Hohenschäftlarn towards München Hbf
Location

Ebenhausen-Schäftlarn station is a station on the Isar Valley Railway from Munich to Bichl in the German state of Bavaria. Since 1981, it has been a station of the Munich S-Bahn. The station building is registered as a historic building on the List of Bavarian Monuments.

== Location ==
The station is located at Prof.-Benjamin-Allee 1 in the district of Ebenhausen in the municipality of Schäftlarn.

Ebenhausen-Schäftlarn is the highest railway station on the original route of the Isar Valley Railway. In its vicinity is the highest point on the line with an altitude of 665 m above sea level.

== History ==
The Isar Valley Railway opened from Thalkirchen to Ebenhausen on 10 June 1891 and it was extended to Wolfratshausen on 27 July. From the beginning there was a railway station in Ebenhausen, which was known as the Isartalbahnhof (station of the Valley Railway Railway) because it was served by trains running on the Valley Railway Railway. The station had three tracks at the opening of line. In addition, two tracks running to buffer stops also existed, which were designed primarily for freight. The station building was built in the renaissance revival style and it is now a listed building. The building has of pavilions on both sides, which are connected by a waiting room.

== Operations ==
The station now has two platform tracks and a central platform, which is 140 metres long and 76 cm high. This is accessible from both sides of the track, but it does not have disabled access. The S-Bahn station is served by S-Bahn line S 7 from Wolfratshausen to Kreuzstraße twice an hour (with intervals alternating between 20 and 40 minutes).
