= München Isartal station =

Coordinates: 48°7′2″N 11°33′29″E

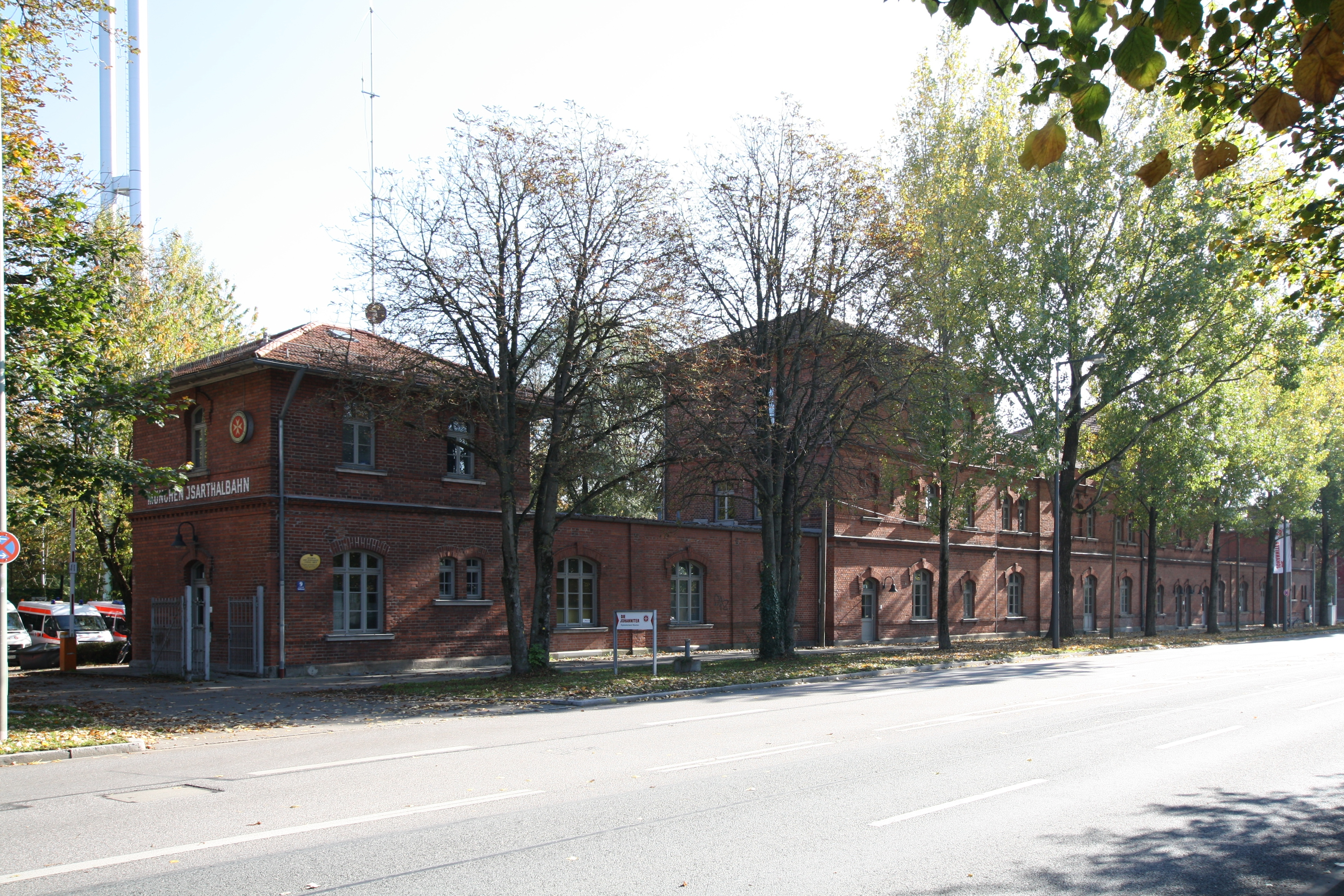
Building of the former Isartal station

München Isartalbahnhof is a former railway station on the Isartalbahn in the Munich borough of Thalkirchen. It is now used by the Johanniter-Unfall-Hilfe service as a rescue station.
