= S7 (Munich) =

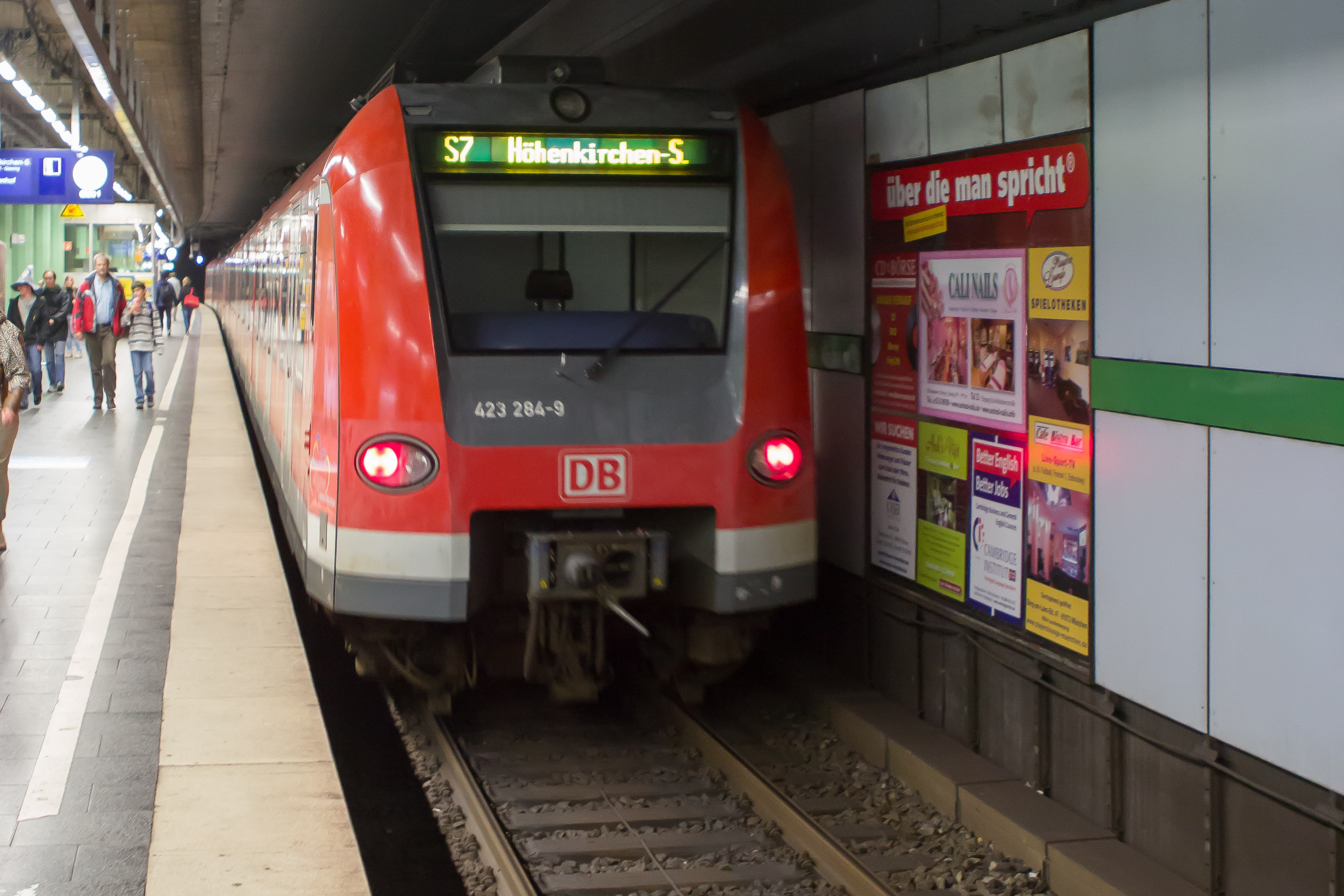

Overview
- Line number: S7
- Locale: Munich, Bavaria, Germany

Service
- System: Munich S-Bahn
- Route number: 999.7
- Operator: S-Bahn Munich
- Rolling stock: DBAG Class 423

Technical
- Electrification: 15 kV, 16.7 Hz AC Overhead lines

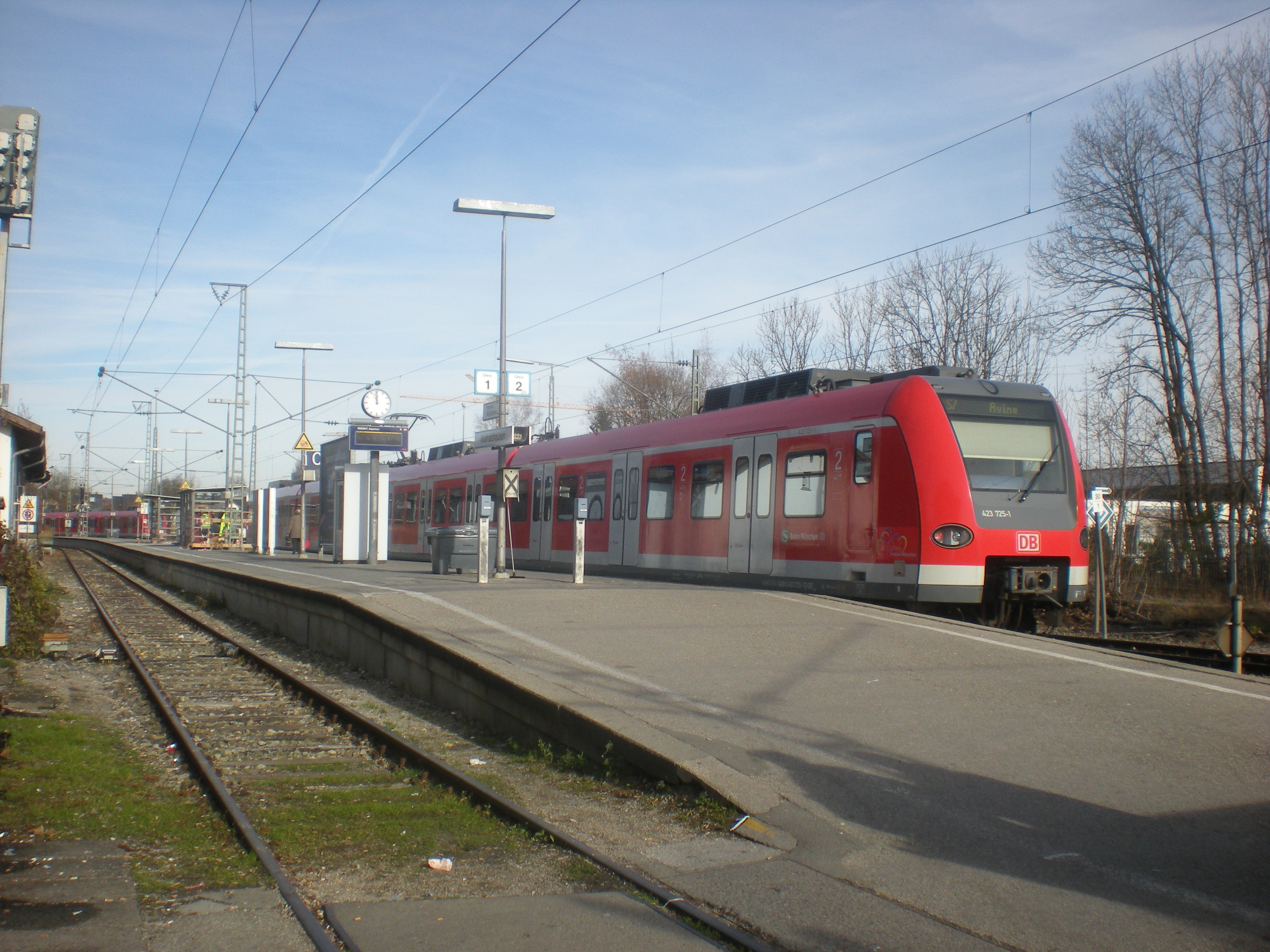
Class 423 train at Wolfratshausen station

Line S7 is a line on the Munich S-Bahn network. It is operated by DB Regio Bayern. It runs from Wolfratshausen via Höllriegelskreuth, to München Hauptbahnhof (central station).

The line is operated at 20-minute intervals between Höllriegelskreuth and Hauptbahnhof. Two out of three trains an hour continue from Höllriegelskreuth to Wolfratshausen, so that the gap between trains alternates between 20 and 40 minutes. It is operated using class 423 four-car electrical multiple units, usually as two coupled sets. In the evenings and on Sundays they generally run as single sets.

The line runs over lines built at various times:

- from Wolfratshausen to a point to the north of Grosshesselohe Isartal station on the Isar Valley Railway, opened by the Lokalbahn AG company (LAG) on 27 July 1891 and electrified from Wolfratshausen to Höllriegelskreuth in May 1960 and from Höllriegelskreuth to Grosshesselohe Isartal at 580 volts DC and converted to 15 kV AC on 27 September 1957
- from a point to the north of Grosshesselohe Isartal station to a point southwest of Munich Donnersbergerbrücke station on the Munich–Holzkirchen railway opened on 24 June 1854 as part of the Bavarian Maximilian's Railway and electrified on 27 September 1957
- the Southern lines tunnel (Südstreckentunnel) to Donnersbergerbrücke station, opened on 31 May 1981
- from Donnersbergerbrücke to the beginning of the S-Bahn trunk line over tracks running parallel to the Munich–Augsburg railway, opened by the Munich–Augsburg Railway Company on 1 September 1839

S-Bahn services commenced on 28 May 1972 as S-Bahn line 10 between Wolfratshausen and service from Wolfratshausen to Holzkirchen wing station (Holzkirchner Flügelbahnhof) of Munich Hauptbahnhof as they could not yet continue through the S-Bahn trunk line tunnel because the so-called southern lines tunnel (Südstreckentunnel), which passes under the long-distance tracks towards Pasing and the S-Bahn trunk line, was not yet available. With the opening of the southern lines tunnel on the S-Bahn route on 31 May 1981, the S-Bahn line from Wolfratshausen continued on the S-Bahn trunk line; as a result it was renamed as line (as single digit numbers were reserved for lines that ran through the trunk line tunnel). Line took over the section of from Munich East to Kreuzstraße. In December 2024 the line was split into now again terminating at Hauptbahnhof and running from Pasing to Kreuzstraße.
