= Bavarian Maximilian Railway =

Railway line in Germany

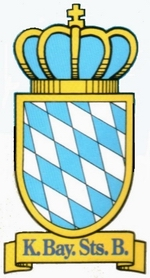

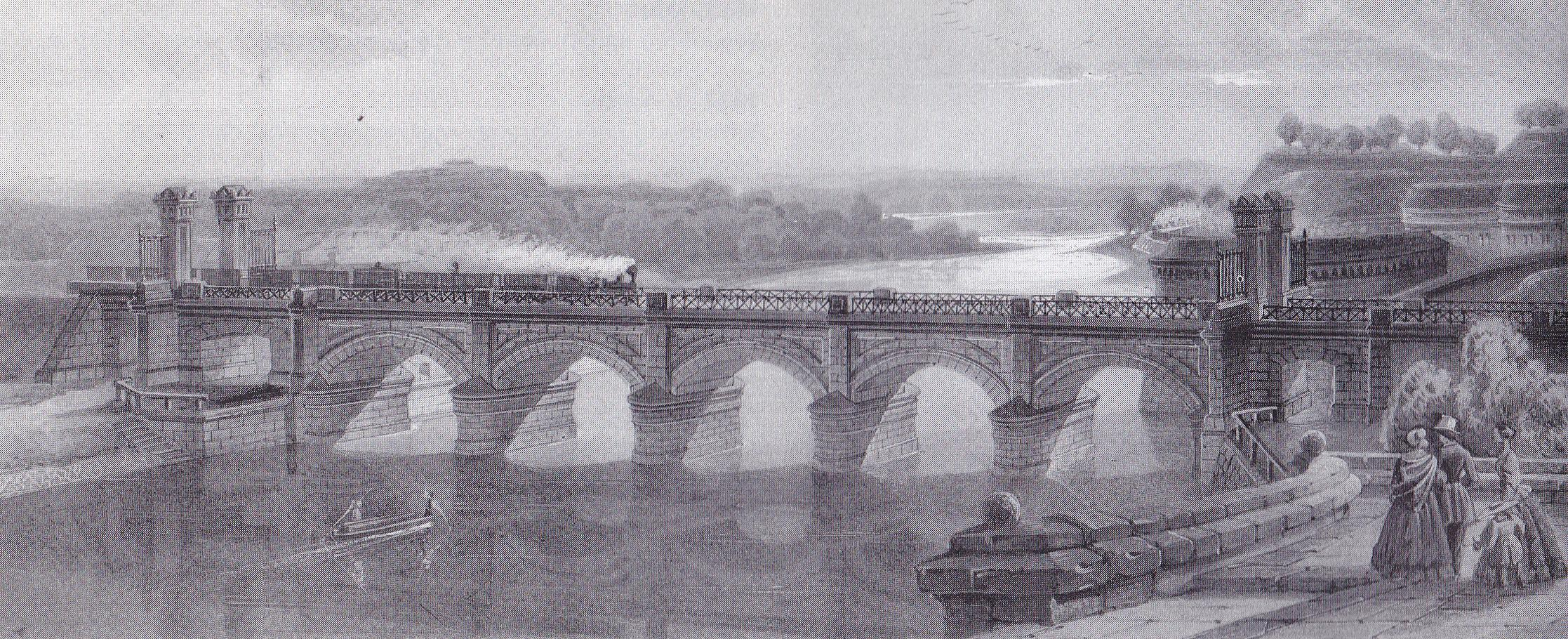
- Danube bridge between Ulm und Neu-Ulm in 1855

Overview
- Native name: Bayerische Maximiliansbahn
- Locale: Bavaria
- Termini: Neu-Ulm; Kufstein

Service
- Type: Line
- Operator(s): Royal Bavarian State Railways

History
- Opened: 1840

Technical
- Line length: 188 km (117 mi)

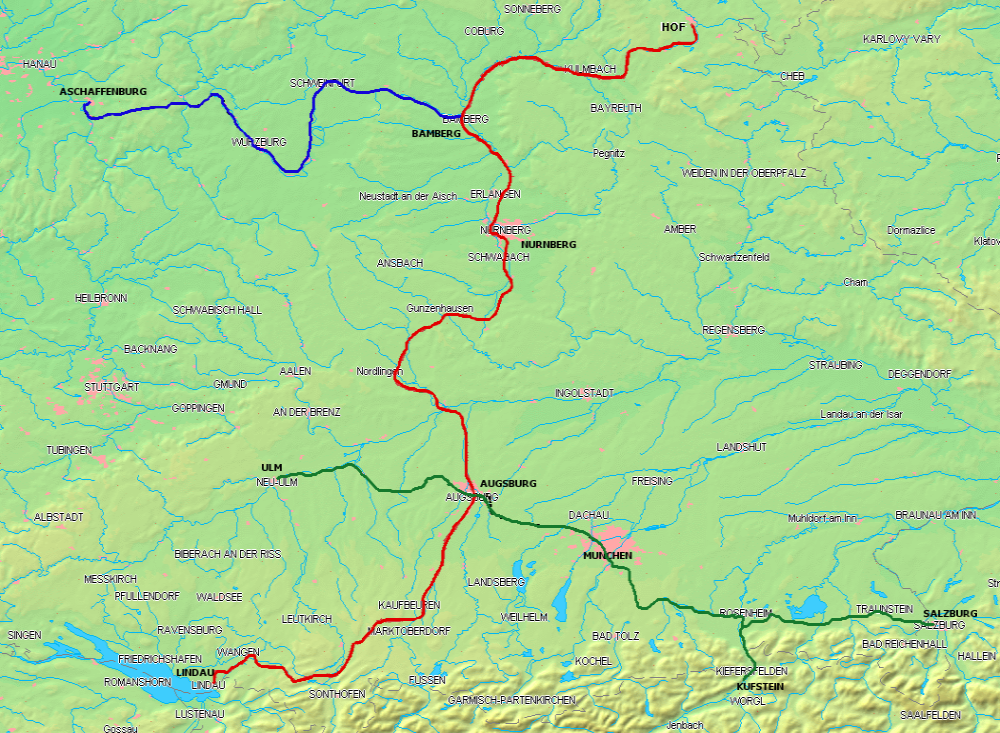
The three Bavarian main lines. The Ludwig South-North Railway is shown in red, the Ludwig Western Railway is shown in blue, and the Maximilian Railway in green

The Bavarian Maximilian Railway (German: Bayerische Maximiliansbahn) was as an east–west line built between the Bavarian border with Württemberg at Neu-Ulm in the west via Augsburg, Munich and Rosenheim to the Austrian border at Kufstein and Salzburg in the east as part of the Royal Bavarian State Railways. The Munich–Augsburg section of the line had already been built by the Munich-Augsburg Railway Company and opened in 1840. The line was named after the reigning King of Bavaria from 1848 to 1864 Maximilian II.

== History ==
Relatively late for a German state, Bavaria decided in around 1851 to complete its major rail links by building an east–west rail link between the German states and Italy via the Brenner railway and via Salzburg to Vienna and the Semmering railway. These lines were expected to be well used, particularly for the connection to the Austrian Adriatic port of Trieste. Treaties agreed with the Kingdom of Württemberg and with the Austrian Empire on 25 April 1850 and ratified in 1851. The route included, the existing line between Augsburg and Munich, completed by the former private Munich-Augsburg Railway Company in 1840.

The line began at the Württemberg and Bavaria border in the middle of the newly built bridge over the Danube between Ulm and Neu-Ulm, and ran for about 85 km to Augsburg. In Ulm, it connected with the Württemberg Eastern railway to Stuttgart and the Southern railway to Friedrichshafen.

From Munich, the line ran for over 106 km over the route now known as the Mangfall Valley line via Großhesselohe and Rosenheim to Kufstein, where it connected with the Austrian Lower Inn Valley line. The Salzburg line branched off in Rosenheim and ran for 83 km via Traunstein to the border near Salzburg.

=== Construction ===
Under a Bavarian law of 4 May 1851 work started on the western section. The 83.7 km long line opened in four sections:

Date	Route	Length
1 May 1854	Centre of the Danube bridge in Ulm–Neu-Ulm	1.3 km
26 September 1853	Neu-Ulm–Burgau	38.1 km
1 May 1854	Burgau–Dinkelscherben	17.9 km
26 September 1853	Dinkelscherben–Augsburg	26.4 km

Construction of the eastern section was regulated by the Bavarian Law of 7 May 1852. The 188 km long line opened in five sections:

Date	Route	Length
24 June 1854	München–Großhesselohe	10.7 km
31 October 1857	Großhesselohe–Rosenheim	62.9 km
5 August 1858	Rosenheim–Border at Kufstein	31.9 km
7 May 1860	Rosenheim–Traunstein	53.3 km
1 August 1860	Traunstein–Border at Salzburg	29.5 km

The three years delay in continuing the line from Großhesselohe to Rosenheim was due to the complicated construction of the great 300-metre bridge over the Isar valley there. The foundation work for the bridge foundations and its three 30-meter piers started in 1852. The heavy traffic on the first section led to building of a second track in 1862. From 1871, this section of the line lost its long-distance services after the opening of the shorter route via Grafing.
