= Munich–Augsburg Railway Company =

The Munich–Augsburg Railway Company (München-Augsburger Eisenbahn-Gesellschaft), the second private railway company in Bavaria, built the Munich–Augsburg line between 1838 and 1840. It was nationalised in 1846 and became part of the Royal Bavarian State Railways, subsequently forming part of the Bavarian Maximilian’s Railway built between 1851 and 1854.

== Foundation and Construction of the Railway ==
After the opening of the first private railway in Bavaria, the Bavarian Ludwig Railway from Nuremberg to Fürth on 7 December 1835, local committees for the construction of railway lines grew up all over Bavaria. The two committees in Augsburg and Munich soon united and had a civil servant draw up a route proposal. The task of carrying out the detailed planning and construction was given to the engineer, Paul Camille Denis, who had just completed the Nuremberg-Fürth line.

After the state had issued the "Basic Regulations for All Railway Statutes in Bavaria" (Fundamentalbestimmungen für sämtliche Eisenbahnstatuten in Bayern) on 28 September 1836, the Munich–Augsburg Railway Company was founded on 23 July 1837. On 3 July 1837, they had already been given the royal assent. However, there were difficulties with the shareholder applications in the early days as a result of delays in obtaining the state licence. Nevertheless, the construction of the railway got under way at the beginning of 1838.

The line, which was almost 62 kilometres (39 mi) long, was opened to traffic in four stages:

- 1 September 1839; Munich – Lochhausen; 12.5 km (7.8 mi)
- 27 October 1839; Lochhausen – Olching; 6.6 km (4.1 mi)
- 7 December 1839; Olching – Maisach; 5.7 km (3.5 mi)
- 4 October 1840; Maisach – Augsburg; 37.1 km (23.1 mi)

For over 20 years, the river Lech was crossed by a 95-metre (312 ft) long wooden bridge. It is reported that King Ludwig I directed that the final opening ceremony would coincide with the beginning of the Oktoberfest.

== Locomotives ==
The company procured a total of eight locomotives from various manufacturers that were all fired with wood. All had interior cylinders and a 1A1 axle arrangement.

- 1837 JUPITER, JUNO, factory numbers 157 and 158 from Stephenson
- 1838 VESTA, VENUS from Sharp
- 1840 VULKAN, MARS from Fenton, Murray and Jackson in Leeds
- 1841 DER MÜNCHNER, factory number 1 from J.A. Maffei, Munich, only for trial runs
- 1842 MERKUR, DIANA from Stephenson

== Nationalisation ==
By a law dated 23 May 1846, the Munich–Augsburg Railway Company was nationalised on 1 June 1846 and taken over by the Royal Bavarian State Railways (Königlich Bayerische Staats-Eisenbahnen). The state paid the shareholders 4.4 million florins.

== Literature ==
- Ludwig von Welser: Bayern-Report, Bände 4–9. Fürstenfeldbruck 1994–2001
