= Wolfratshausen station =

Railway station in Germany

Wolfratshausen
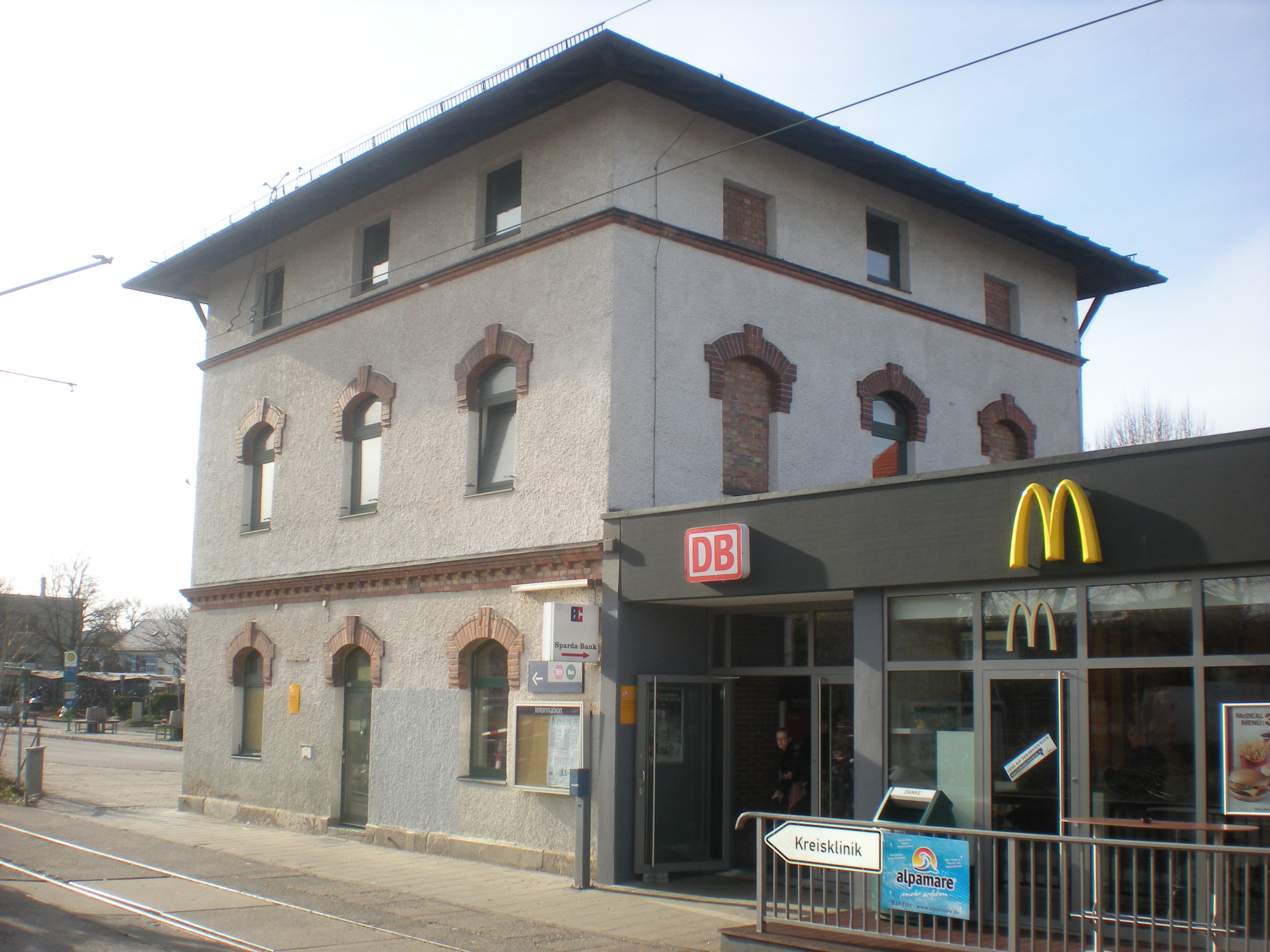
- Station building from the trackside

General information
- Location: Bahnhofstr. 41, Wolfratshausen, Bavaria; Germany
- Coordinates: 47°54′51″N 11°25′37″E
- Line: Munich–Bichl (km 26.30)
- Platforms: 2
- Connections: 301, 302, 370, 372, 373, 374, 375, 376, 377, 378, 379, 974, 975, X320, X970

Construction
- Accessible: Yes

Other information
- Station code: 6858
- DS100 code: MWO
- IBNR: 8006550
- Category: 6
- Fare zone: : 3 and 4
- Website: www.bahnhof.de; stationsdatenbank.de

History
- Opened: 27 July 1891

Services
Preceding station	Munich S-Bahn	Following station
Terminus	S7	Icking towards München Hbf
Location

Wolfratshausen station is a station of the Munich S-Bahn. It is located in the Upper Bavarian town of Wolfratshausen in Germany. It is classified by Deutsche Bahn as a category 6 station. It has two platform tracks next to a central platform. The station is located in the network area of the Münchner Verkehrs- und Tarifverbund (Munich Transport and Tariff Association, MVV) and is served by line 7 of the S-Bahn, which is operated by Deutsche Bahn.

The station was established on 27 July 1891 as a terminus when the Isar Valley Railway from Munich was put into operation. The line was built and operated by Lokalbahn AG (LAG). The station became a through station on 1 June 1897 when the Isar Valley Railway was extended to Eurasburg. In 1898, the line was extended from Eurasburg to Bichl. Until the nationalisation of the LAG in 1938 the Wolfratshausen station included a locomotive depot. From 1957 to 27 May 1972 Deutsche Bundesbahn closed the line between Bichl and Wolfratshausen in several stages, so that Wolfratshausen station became a terminus. On 28 May 1972, S-Bahn services began between Munich and Wolfratshausen.

== Location ==
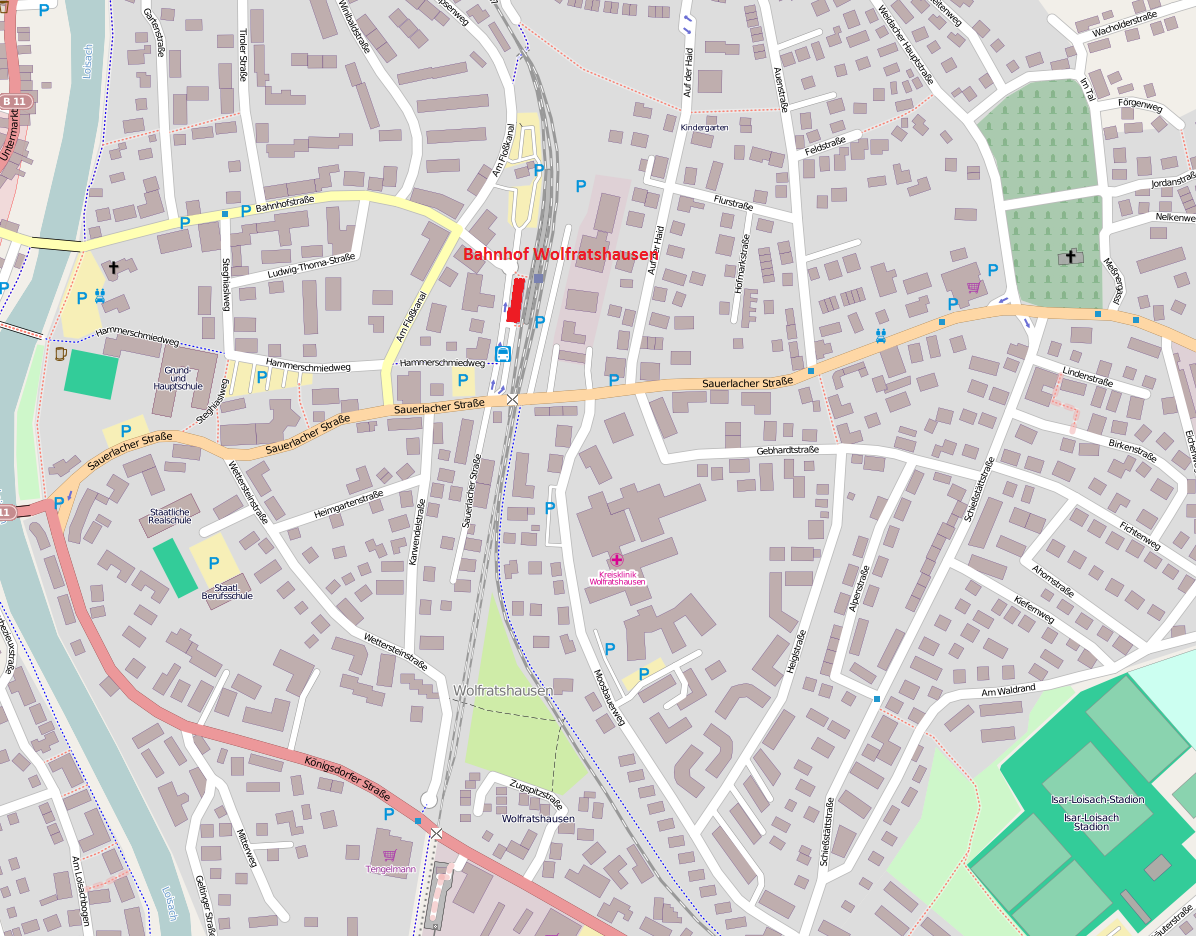
Map of Wolfratshausen station with the station building labeled in red

The station is located to the east of central Wolfratshausen. The station building is located to the west of the tracks and has the address of Bahnhofstraße 41. Bahnhofstraße, Sauerlacher Straße and Straße Am Floßkanal run to the west of the tracks. In the south of the station building is the Wolfratshausen bus station. The southern part of the station precinct is crossed by state route 2070, running along Sauerlacher Straße and crossing the tracks over a level crossing. Mühlpointweg passes through a tunnel under the tracks to the north of the station.

The station is now the terminus of the Isar Valley Railway (line VzG 5507), a single-track, electrified main line. The station is located at the kilometre 26.30 point, which is measured from the closed Munich terminal station of the Isar Valley Railway over a partially closed route. The service on the line is timetable route 999.7 of the Deutsche Bahn.

== History ==
=== Planning and construction ===
On 24 October 1886 the Bavarian government issued a concession for the building of a metre-gauge railway from Munich via Wolfratshausen to Rottmannshöhe on Lake Starnberg. Its proponent, Siegfried Klopfer had proposed to build the line to standard gauge in 1885. It was proposed that the Wolfratshausen station would be built on the heights at Dorfen to the northwest of the town, which was said to be about three quarters of an hour away from Wolfratshausen marketplace. Wolfratshausen protested this situation, because it feared that its population would continue to decline as other communities with a direct rail link would have an advantage over Wolfratshausen. The company responsible for the construction of the line, Aktiengesellschaft Isarbahn, said that building the station in the valley of the Loisach in central Wolfratshausen would cost up to 80,000 gold marks more than building at the proposed site. Wolfratshausen offered 60,000 marks for the construction of the station in the valley and founded on 26 September 1888 the Bahnverein München–Wolfratshausen (Munich–Wolfratshausen Railway Company) to promote the relocation of the station. On 27 September 1888, Wolfratshausen came to an agreement with the railway company, which promised to build a road between the station and the marketplace. On 6 November 1889, responsibility for the construction and operation of the line was taken over by Lokalbahn AG (LAG). At the same time it was decided to abandon the terminus at Rottmannshöhe and to instead build the line from Wolfratshausen via Eurasburg to Bichl. This created an opportunity for Wolfratshausen to request the location of the station in the Loisach valley again. After the mayor of Wolfratshausen confirmed, on 23 November 1889, that the land required for the rail project would be transferred free, it was decided to build Wolfratshausen station in the valley. Construction work began on 27 May 1890, but the construction of the Ebenhausen–Wolfratshausen section was delayed by landslides at Schlederleite to the north of Wolfratshausen. On 27 July 1891, the Isar Valley Railway was finally opened to Wolfratshausen.

=== Operations under Lokalbahn AG ===
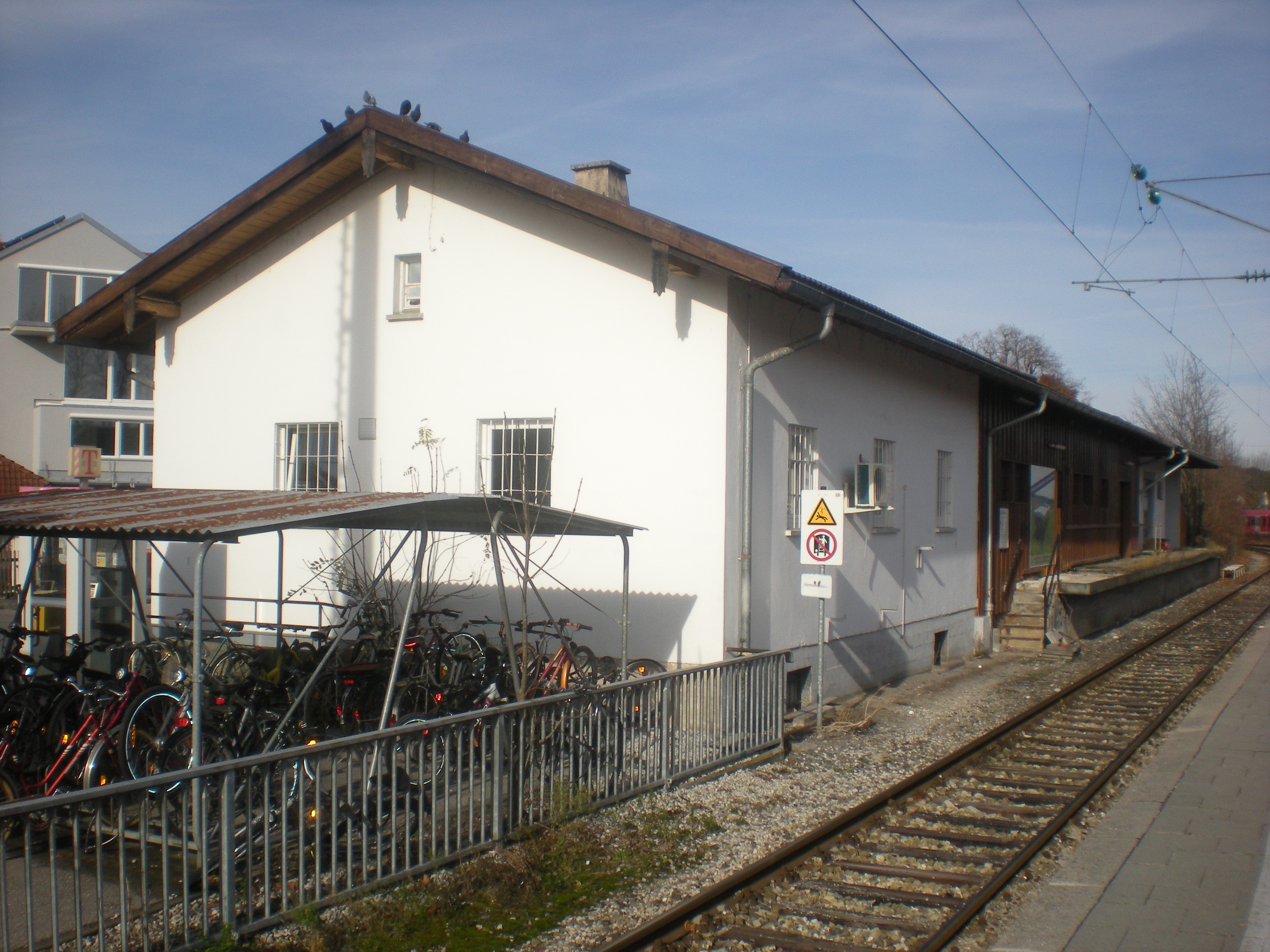
The goods shed opposite the station building in 2012

On 27 July 1891, Wolfratshausen station was opened as the terminus of the Isar Valley Railway. The reception building was built to the west of the tracks. Opposite the station building, on the other side of the station forecourt, there was a station restaurant. As the terminus of the line, a depot with three track was built to the north of the station. To the west of the depot there was a roundhouse with one stall. This had a Pulsometer steam pump for lifting water. Shortly before the roundhouse there was a coal shed, where coal was stored for the steam locomotives. The station had three platform tracks and another, which was intended for the carriage of freight. The freight facilities were at the southern end of the fourth track. There was a freight shed, with ramps at the side and at the front for loading freight, and a weighbridge with a capacity of 20 tonnes.

Construction began on 25 August 1896 on the extension of the Isar Valley Railway to Bichl. The line to Eurasburg was opened on 1 June 1897 and it extended to Bichl to connect with the State Railway from Tutzing to Kochel on 23 May 1898. Wolfratshausen station continued to be significant for railway operations, since carriages were detached from trains coming from Munich and added to trains returning to Munich. The extension of the line to Eurasburg also led to the development of the tracks within the station area. So an additional siding was built to the west of the freight shed. No later than 1909, a turntable with a diameter of 6.5 metres was built on the first track from the carriage house. In addition, the capacity of the carriage weighbridge in front of the freight shed was raised from 20 to 30 tons. Also later than 1909 a watering point was established, which was connected at both ends to allow the operation of through passenger trains; this was supplied from the local water supply. East of the wagon shed, a rail connection was built to the icehouse of the Eberl-Faber brewery. From 1909, track 3 was no longer used for passenger trains, but on the Munich side of the station building an additional bay track was built.

Wolfratshausen station had no importance in the First World War and so it was not damaged. Only the ever-increasing losses of the LAG after 1915 affected operations on the Isar Valley Railway. Thus from 1915 fewer trains were run on the railway and only third class accommodation was offered between Wolfratshausen and Munich. Eleven pairs of trains did not run each day between Munich and Wolfratshausen again until the end of 1933; this was made possible by financial support from the municipalities and the reduction the parallel bus services. On 1 August 1938, the nationalisation of the LAG was agreed and it was then acquired by Deutsche Reichsbahn.

=== World War II and electrification ===
In the Second World War from 1940 to 1941 a siding was built that branched off the Isar Valley Railway at Wolfratshausen station to a munitions factory in Geretsried. Deutsche Reichsbahn planned to build its own freight yard south of Wolfratshausen for munition shipments, but this was never put into effect. As the destruction of Munich increased, Deutsche Reichsbahn established a connection from the siding to the south, producing a triangular junction in Wolfratshausen, allowing freight trains to run via Bichl and Tutzing. Wolfratshausen station was still responsible for the assembly of the trains, and for shunting, which was needed in Geretsried and Wolfratshausen. As part of the Isar Valley Railway was destroyed between 1943 and 1944 by air raids, regular passenger services could not be resumed until 1946. The depot was probably destroyed in World War II. Also, the roundhouse was demolished after the last class 64 steam locomotive used the Isar Valley Railway.

On 31 May 1959, Deutsche Bundesbahn closed the Beuerberg to Bichl section due to low patronage and the poor condition of the track. In May 1960, the Isar Valley Railway was electrified to Wolfratshausen. On 29 June 1960, electrical operations commenced from Munich to Wolfratshausen and the first electric "glass trains" arrived in Wolfratshausen station. A substation was established for the supply of the overhead power in Wolfratshausen on a power line from Kochel to Holzkirchen for supplying power to the railways at 16 2/3 Hz. Henceforth, operations between Wolfratshausen and Beuerberg were carried with Uerdingen railbuses, with passengers changing trains at Wolfratshausen station. Finally, on 27 May 1972, the section from Wolfratshausen to Beuerberg was closed and Wolfratshausen station became the terminus of the Isar Valley Railway again.

=== Integration in the Munich S-Bahn ===
On 28 May 1972, the opening of the Munich S-Bahn transformed the station fundamentally. Among other things, a new 76 centimetre high central platform was built, which now has a barrier-free even-height level crossing over track 1. The entrance building was also renovated. The northern pavilion and the waiting area were demolished and replaced by a flat building, which adjoins the north of the southern pavilion, which still exists. No later than 1972, general freight traffic was stopped so that the crossovers to the freight shed were demolished. The rail connection to the brewery was also shut down and is no longer available.

S-Bahn line S10 service from Wolfratshausen to Holzkirchen wing station (Holzkirchner Flügelbahnhof) of Munich Central Station (Hauptbahnhof) could not yet continue through the S-Bahn trunk line tunnel because the so-called southern lines tunnel (Südstreckentunnel), which passes under the long-distance tracks towards Pasing and the S-Bahn trunk line, was not yet available. With the opening of the southern lines tunnel on the S-Bahn route on 31 May 1981, the S-Bahn line from Wolfratshausen continued on the S-Bahn trunk line; as a result it was renamed as line S 7.

== Infrastructure ==
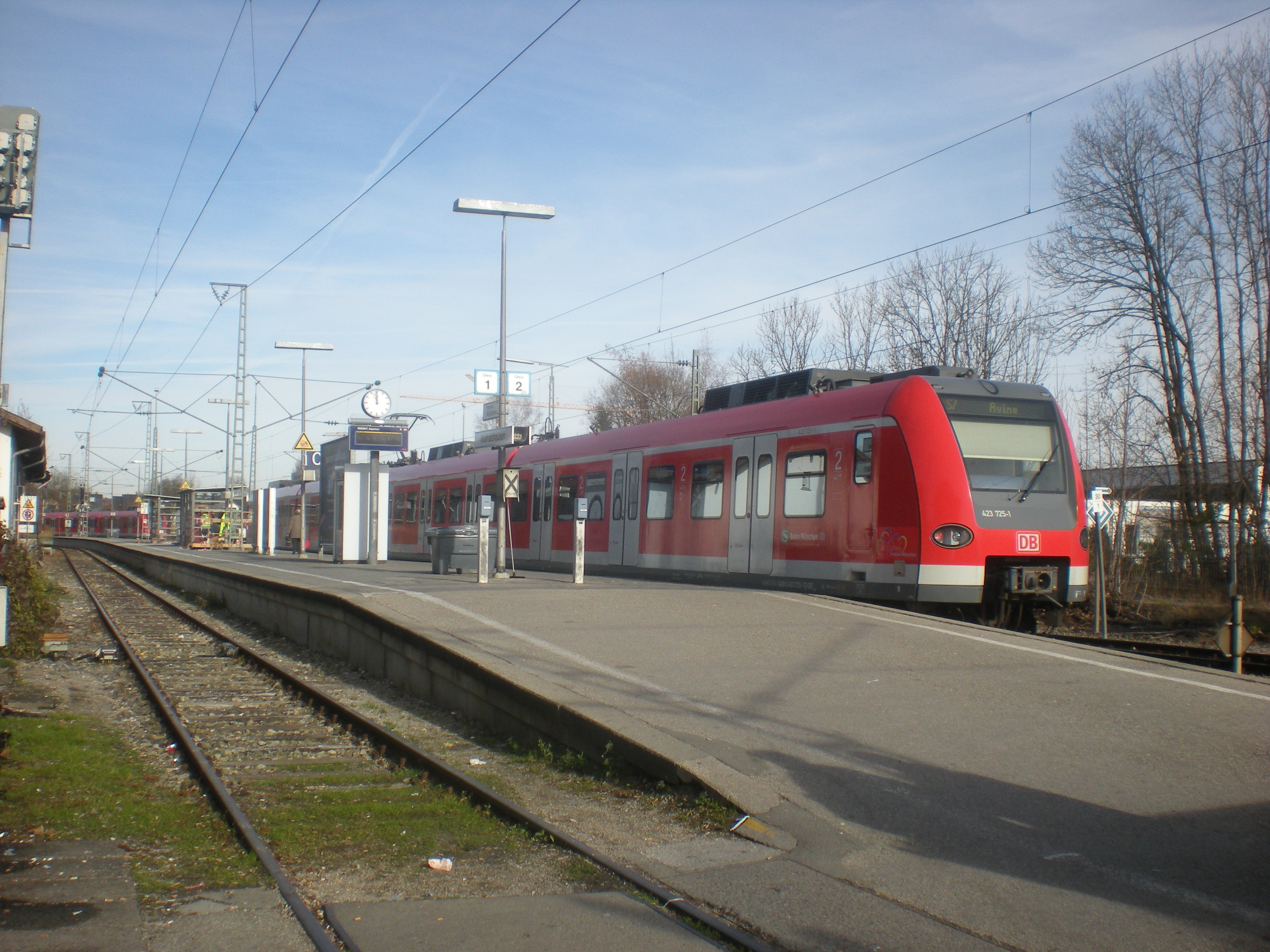
Platform with S7 service to Aying

Wolfratshausener station has two platform tracks on a 140 metre long and 76 centimeters high central platform connected by a barrier-free level crossing over track 1 to the station building. The platform is not covered. In addition to the platform tracks 1 and 2 there is a track 3, which does not have a platform and continues to the south across a level crossing over Sauerlacher Straße to a junction with a siding to Geretsried. South of the junction there is a double-track railway yard, of which only one track is used. After the buffer stop at the end of the rolling stock storage area, the track of the former Isar Valley Railway still continues for about 450 metres further south before it ends. In the northern part of the station there are more branches from track 3 to another rolling stock storage area with four tracks, some of which is still being used for parking carriages.

Track	Usable length	Height	Current use
1	140 m	76 cm	S7 towards Munich
2	140 m	76 cm	S7 towards Munich

=== Station building ===
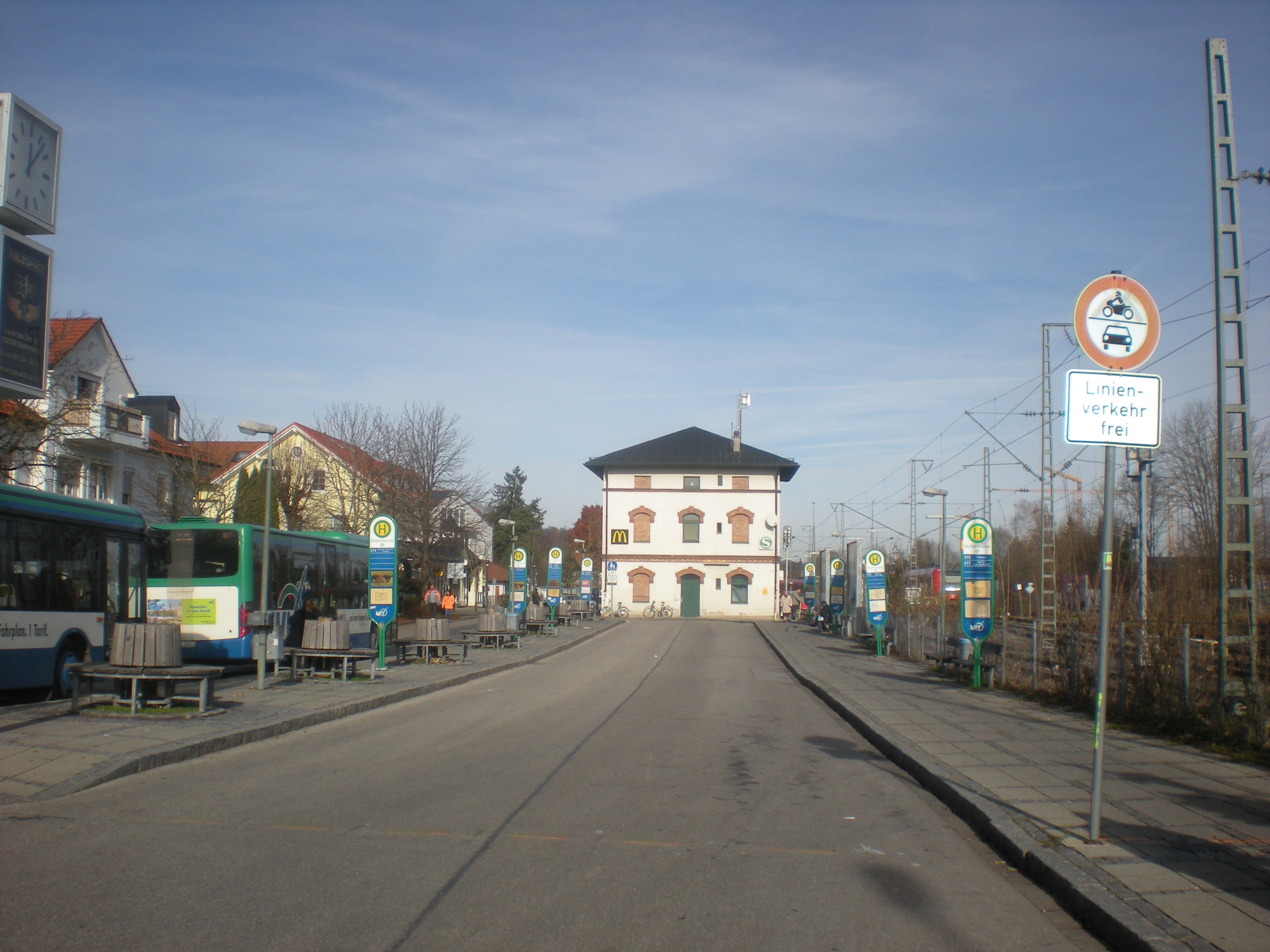
Station building and bus station

The station building was built in 1891 for the opening of the Isar Valley Railway. It originally consisted of pavilions of different sizes in the north and south, between which there was an open concourse. Such buildings still exist on the Isar Valley Railway at Grosshesselohe Isartal station, Pullach station and Ebenhausen-Schäftlarn station. The southern, three-story main building contained the ticket office. The northern two-storey pavilion hosted railway service rooms and toilets. The open waiting area was supported by three pillars. In 1972, the station was transformed radically in preparation for S-Bahn operations. The northern pavilion and the waiting area were demolished and replaced by a flat building, which adjoins the northern end of the southern pavilion, which still exists. The new annex houses a waiting room and a McDonald's restaurant, while the old building contains DB's travel centre.

== Operations ==
=== Passengers ===
Wolfratshausen station is now the terminus of the Munich S-Bahn line S 7 from Wolfratshausen to Kreuzstraße, which every 20 or 40 minutes alternatively. It is used daily by about 50 S-Bahn trains operated with class 423 sets.

=== Freight ===
The freight shed, which was opposite the station building, was used until about 1972. There, piece goods and other freight from the region were shipped to the ramps. Wolfratshausen station formerly had a rail connection to the icehouse of the Eberl-Faber brewery, but this has been closed and demolished. Today the station only operates wagon-load freight over a siding to Geretsried for delivery to companies in Geretsried, requiring shunting in Wolfratshausen.

=== Buses ===
In the south of the station building is the Wolfratshausen bus station, which forms the central hub for buses in Wolfratshausen. This stop is served by the MVV regional bus lines (as of 2013), 301, 302, 370, 372, 373, 374, 375, 376, 377, 378, 379 and 975. Lines 301, 302 and 370 serve the residential areas within the towns of Wolfratshausen and Geretsried. Line 372 runs along the former Isar Valley Railway to Penzberg. Line 373 runs along Lake Starnberg to Seeshaupt. The 374 bus runs from Wolfratshausen via Geretsried to Beuerberg and line 375 runs to Egling. Lines 376 and 379 both run from Wolfratshausen via Geretsried to Bad Heilbrunn or Bad Tölz. Line 377 runs via Egling to Bad Tölz and line 975 runs to Starnberg.

== Future ==
Deutsche Bahn initiated the planning approval process in 2010 for an extension of line S 7 from Wolfratshausen to Geretsried which was scheduled for completion in 2015. Instead of using the existing siding to Geretsried, the new line would be built via Gelting, branching from the route of the Isar Valley Railway south of Wolfratshausen station. In mid-September 2023, the Bavarian Transport Minister Christian Bernreiter stated that, according to information from the Federal Railway Authority, the planning approval and thus the approval for construction might be granted in 2024 at the earliest.

== Sources ==
- Claus-Jürgen Schulze (2002). Die Isartalbahn (in German). Bufe-Fachbuchverlag. ISBN 3-922138-04-7.
