= Isar Valley Railway =

Railway line in Bavaria

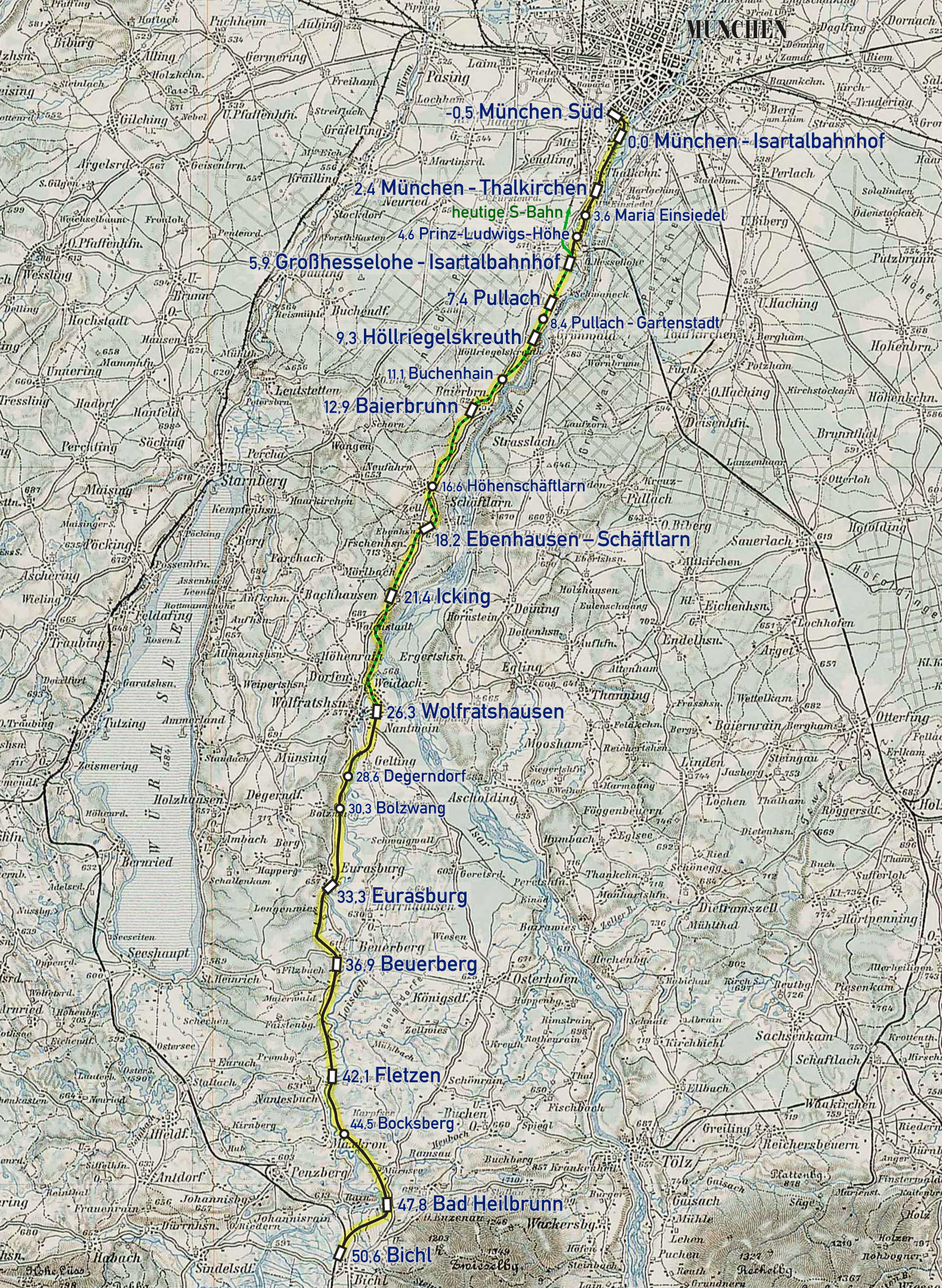

Overview
- Native name: Isartalbahn
- Line number: 5507
- Locale: Bavaria, Germany
- Termini: Munich South; Bichl

Service
- Route number: 999.7

Technical
- Line length: 51.1 km (31.8 mi)
- Number of tracks: 2: München Isartalbf–Wolfratshausen
- Track gauge: 1,435 mm (4 ft 8 1/2 in) standard gauge
- Minimum radius: 200 m (656 ft)
- Electrification: 1900–1955: 580 volts; since 1955: 15 kV/16.7 Hz AC overhead catenary
- Operating speed: 120 km/h (75 mph) (maximum)
- Maximum incline: 3.3%

The Isar River Valley Railway (German: Isartalbahn) is a standard gauge and electrified railway in the German state of Bavaria. Originally it was 51.1 km long, running from Munich South station to Bichl and was built from 1891 to 1898 in sections by the Lokalbahn AG company (LAG). The section from Munich South to Wolfratshausen was classified as a main line, while the section from Wolfratshausen to Bichl was classified as a branch line. In 1900, the LAG electrified the section from the Isartalbahnhof (the station for the Isar River Valley Railway in Munich) to Höllriegelskreuth for suburban services at 580 volts DC.

In 1938, the LAG and, with it, the Isar Valley Railway were nationalised. After the Second World War, Deutsche Bundesbahn converted the electrification to 15 kV AC (16 2/3 Hz); this was completed in 1955 and extended to Wolfratshausen in 1960. The northern section from Munich South to Grosshesselohe Isartal station and the southern section from Wolfratshausen to Bichl was closed by Deutsche Bundesbahn between 1959 and 1972. The middle section is now used by line S 7 of the Munich S-Bahn. The name of the line refers to the Isar as the northern half of the line follows the river's western bank. On the other hand, the southern section is located in the valley of the Loisach.

== History ==
In the mid-1860s, the construction of almost all the major railways in Bavaria had been completed. Holzkirchen was connected to the Bavarian railway network on 31 October 1857. Penzberg was connected to the network on 16 October 1865. On 29 April 1869, the local railway law (Vizinalbahngesetz), which promoted projects for the construction of local railways, was enacted. The municipality of Tölz sought a connection to the railway network. Originally two options were discussed: Holzkirchen–Tölz and Penzberg–Tölz. The municipalities in the upper Isar valley, however, wanted a railway from Munich to Tölz so that the municipalities could also be connected. Architect Friedrich Fischer presented an initial application for an alignment from Munich via Tölz to Lenggries. It requested the establishment of a commission for the planning of this option. On 27 May 1870, Fischer received permission to set up a commission. The first meeting of the commission was held on 11 July 1870. It proposed a line from Munich South via Großhesselohe, Pullach, Icking, Wolfratshausen and Tölz to Lenggries. The cost was estimated at four million guilders. The Munich City Council debated in January 1871 a proposal for a line from Holzkirchen to Tölz. Then on 18 February 1871 the option via Holzkirchen was excluded. The glass manufacturer Leo Gasteiger requested a licence to build railways on the Thalkirchen–Beuerberg–Tölz and Beuerberg–Bichl–Murnau routes on 16 January 1872. This was not approved, however, because the line would have competed with the Munich–Garmisch-Partenkirchen railway, which was already under construction.

In 1873, a projected railway called the München und die Isartalbahn (Munich and Isar Valley Railway) was proposed. The Isar River Valley Railway could have been extended via the Arlberg to Italy. In the following years there were discussions about the project, but the commissioning of the Mittenwald Railway ended support for this project. In 1881, the next project was proposed. The locomotive factory of Krauss & Co planned with the town of Wolfratshausen a narrow gauge railway from Munich South to Wolfratshausen. The line would run for 18 kilometres along the main roads and for ten kilometres on its own route. On 28 August 1881, the project was presented in Wolfratshausen. In addition, a railway committee was formed. Wolfratshausen was not satisfied with the proposal to build its station near the village of Weidach, so on 31 January 1881 there was an inspection of the line. The project was subsequently abandoned, but it is not known why.

On 24 January 1886, Siegfried Klopfer requested a license to build a metre gauge line from Munich via Wolfratshausen to Leoni on Lake Starnberg. Klopfer had proposed to build the line to standard gauge on 27 February 1885. Adolf Decher took over developing the project. In May 1886, it was proposed to extend the planned line from Munich South to Wolfratshausen as far as Rottmannshöhe. The Munich–Wolfratshausen section would have been developed as the rail project proposed by Krauss. On 25 July 1887, the Isarbahn company was established for the realisation of the project. The company appointed Franz Mayerhofer as chief executive. Ernst Böhringer, among others, were founders of the company. Wolfratshausen opposed the location of its proposed station on the heights at Dorfen to the northwest of the town. A letter of protest was written to the royal district office suggesting that the long distance from the station to the market place would take three quarters of an hour to walk. Wolfratshausen wrote that no station would be better than having such a distant station and that the population would continue to fall, as other communities with a direct rail link would have an advantage over Wolfratshausen. In October 1887, newspapers reported that the planning the line already involved 30 men. Böhringer and Klopfer apparently disagreed about the rail project, so Böhringer requested the concession for himself. On 11 March 1888, the application for the concession was cancelled. Newspapers in the area reported in the meantime that the rail project proposed by Ernst Boehringer had been accepted.

In 1888, Ernst Boehringer continued to refuse to relocate the Wolfratshausen station, which would require additional costs of up to 80,000 gold marks per kilometre. In the following months there was a rumour that it was planned to move the end of the line from Rottmannshöhe to Eurasburg. Wolfratshausen now offered a grant of 60,000 marks for the construction of the station in the valley. The municipalities around Eurasburg, however, gathered money to outbid Wolfratshausen and its offer had no success. Wolfratshausen now commissioned the lawyer Dollman. On 26 September 1888, they founded the Bahnverein München–Wolfratshausen (Munich–Wolfratshausen Railway Company) to promote the interests of Wolfratshausen. But a day later, Wolfratshausen came to an agreement with Ernst Böhringer. The railway company undertook to build a road to the station from the town and to keep it in good condition. On 13 November 1888, the railway project was granted a concession by Prince Regent Luitpold. On 4 January 1889, the Royal District Office of Munich 2 was informed that a standard gauge railway line would be built and that the additional costs over the construction of a narrow-gauge railway would be borne by the neighbouring municipalities by ceding part of their land for free. On 25 January 1889, there was a call again in some communities for the relocation of the railway to the Loisach valley. This was rejected. On 21 March 1889, detailed planning was transferred to the Munich-based LAG.

On 6 November 1889, the Lokalbahn Aktien-Gesellschaft und Cie. (Isartalbahn) was established for the construction and operation of the Isar Valley Railway. The LAG was involved in this as a company liable for the Isar Valley Railway Company's debts. The terminus at Rottmannshöhe was dropped and the line would continue towards Bichl. On 6 November 1890, the LAG decided that the Isar Valley Railway would initially only be built to Ebenhausen. An extension would be in operation within five years of the opening of the initial section. This gave Wolfratshausen another chance to get a station in its valley if it ceded the land for the construction of the railway for free. On 23 November 1889, the mayor of Wolfratshausen confirmed that the land would be given to the railway company. The Munich-Wolfratshausen Railway Company protested against an extension to Rottmannshöhe. The company, however, had no more success, as it had already been decided to build the line.

=== Construction and opening of the Munich–Wolfratshausen section ===
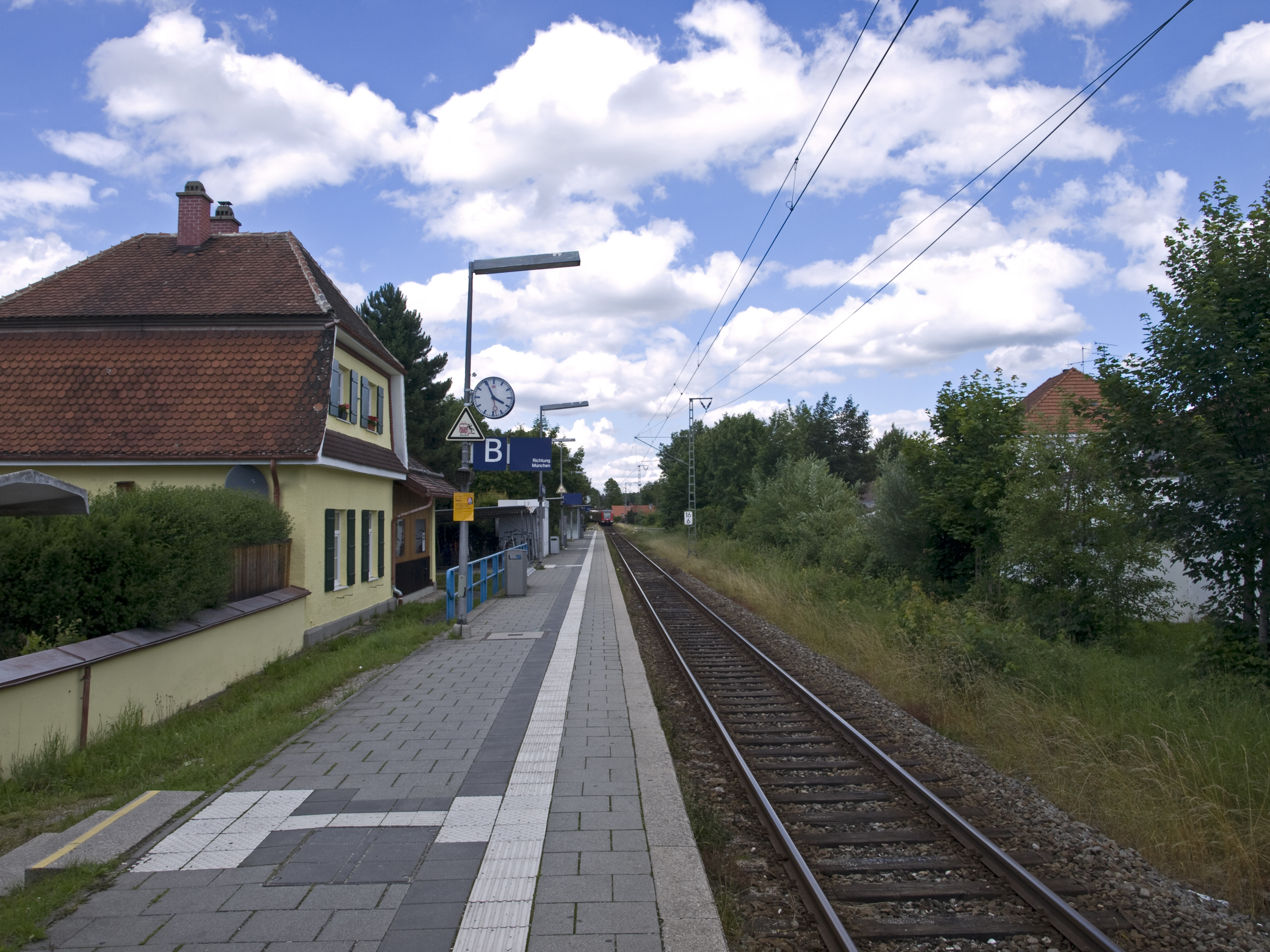
Hohenschäftlarn station

On 16 February 1890, tenders for the track were released. Lot I and II passed through Pullach, Solln, Thalkirchen and Sendling. This would employ about 300 men. Lot III included Hohenschäftlarn and Baierbrunn, employing 200 men. Zell, Irschenberg Icking and were in lot IV, employing 250 to 300 men. The last contract section, which included the section from Weidach to Wolfratshausen, would also use a construction locomotive, which was locomotive 15 of the LAG. The concession for the construction and operation of the Isar Valley Railway was issued to the LAG by Prince Regent Luitpold on 21 April 1890. Construction work started on 27 May 1890 between Thalkirchen and Wolfratshausen. The work proceeded quickly. In February 1891, the Loisach bridge at Wolfratshausen was put into operation. This contained 6000 Zentners of iron. On 24 May, the first trial run was made, accompanied by the press, between Thalkirchen and Ebenhausen. The completion of the line between Ebenhausen and Wolfratshausen was delayed because there were repeated landslides in the Schlederleite section, just north of Wolfratshausen. The official trial run on the section from Thalkirchen to Ebenhausen was held on 9 June. A day later, the section was opened. The section from Ebenhausen to Wolfratshausen was taken into operation on 27 July 1891. The trains were mostly well utilised on weekends and holidays, as many of the inhabitants of Munich used the railway for excursions, so the Isar Valley Railway carried up to 20,000 people on holidays. Still in its opening year only 292,000 passengers used the railway.

There were previously negotiations between the City of Munich and the LAG over the route between Thalkirchen and Munich. The negotiations dragged on because the LAG wanted to build a tram line from Sendlinger Tor to the station of the Isar Valley Railway. This project had not been approved by the city. This complicated the negotiations. Once a contract had been concluded, the LAG had to pay 209,565.48 gold marks for the land. In addition, any road that was affected on this section had to be replaced. It was not possible to start construction until after the opening of the first section to Ebenhausen. The city of Munich claimed that the late start of the work was not its fault. The transport of freight between Munich South and Thalkirchen started on 10 April 1892. Passenger services began on 1 June 1892 as the station building of the Isar Valley Railway was not ready until that time. The first repairs on the line were necessary as early as 8 September 1892. The bridges were not approved for double-heading, as the iron girders were too weak. This restriction could only be lifted if the bridge's supports were strengthened. In order to serve the emerging villa colony of Prinz-Ludwigs-Höhe, a station was built there in 1893. Freight operations started shortly after the opening of the line in 1892 and in 1893, the largest loads occurred because, after an infestation of the Forstenrieder Park by Black Arches caterpillars, the damaged wood had to be removed quickly. So in 1893, the freight traffic was at full capacity with about 4,500 wagon loads. In the following years, freight traffic decreased again until it rose again after 1900.

=== Extension to Bichl ===
In February 1891, the Munich-Kochel railway committee (Eisenbahncomitee München–Kochel) was founded. This favoured the extension of the Isar Valley Railway to Bichl in order to make a connection to the state railway to Kochel. In June 1894. the Royal Bavarian State Railways announced that the railway line from Penzberg to Kochel was planned. In December 1894, it was made clear again that a change of the planned route of the LAG was not out of the question. The LAG was awarded a concession to plan the railway from Wolfratshausen to Kochel on 21 June 1895; this was reissued on 27 June 1896. Since the Royal Bavarian State Railways feared losses on the construction and operation on the longer route from Munich via Tutzing to Kochel, it would not allow the extension of the Isar Valley Railway before the State Railway's line. Also fares on the Isar Valley Railway had to be higher. The construction of the extension began on 25 August 1896. On 1 June 1897, the section from Wolfratshausen to Eurasburg opened. On 15 August 1897, it was extended to Beuerberg. Since the construction of the State Railway's line was delayed, the rest of the Isar Valley Railway's line to Bichl was not opened until 23 May 1898.

=== Development and electrification from Munich to Höllriegelskreuth ===
Passenger traffic rose sharply in the subsequent period between Munich and Höllriegelskreuth. The latter station opened up the possibility that the neighbouring municipality of Grünwald, which from 1910 had an interurban tram line of the Munich Tramway, could have its own railway connection. Duplication of the line between Munich and the station of the Isar Valley Railway and Höllriegelskreuth was necessary for the line to handle the heavy excursion traffic on weekends in particular. Duplication started on 21 September 1896. Between Pullach and Höllriegelskreuth the second track was completed on 2 November 1896. Duplication between Pullach and Thalkirchen was put into operation on 1 May 1897. Due to negotiations with the city and with land owners in Munich, duplication of the section from the Munich station of the Isar Valley Railway to Thalkirchen was not completed until 23 December 1897. At the same time level crossings were protected with barriers. As the use of electric railcars would be more economic, the LAG requested approval for the electrification of the line from Munich Isartalbahnhof to Höllriegelskreuth. The LAG already operated the Meckenbeuren–Tettnang, Türkheim–Wörishofen and Bad Aibling–Feilnbach lines using three electric railcars; the company was considered a pioneer in this area.

The approval for the electrification of the Isar Valley Railway was given on 22 February 1899. Thalkirchen was chosen as the site of the power station. The LAG began construction of the power station on 5 April 1899 and of the overhead line on 17 May 1899. It used direct current at 580 volts. On 15 January 1900, the electrical equipment became operational. The total cost amounted to 623,000 gold marks. It was possible to operate services at regular 15 minute intervals. In 1900 an average of 3,400 persons were transported every day. Until the First World War, passenger numbers continued to be boosted by excursion traffic. In 1904, the maximum speed between Wolfratshausen Bichl was increased from 30 to 40 km/h.

=== Further development and nationalisation proposals ===
Around 1900 a request was made for the Isar valley Railway to be extended to Innsbruck and for it to be nationalised. The Royal Bavarian State Railways carried out the initial planning in 1904 and determined an approximate route. In addition, the configuration work began on a curve connecting the line to the state railway in Pullach. On 1 January 1908, the plan for an extension to Innsbruck was abandoned because it had been decided to extend the line from Munich to Garmisch-Partenkirchen to Innsbruck as the Mittenwald Railway. The population, however, was still not satisfied. The high ticket prices charged by the LAG as a condition of the extension to Bichl could be avoided with nationalisation. A trip on the 50.5-kilometre-long (31.4 mi) Isar Valley Railway in first class with a 20% local railway surcharge cost 5.30 gold marks (RM), while the 66.5-kilometre-long (41.3 mi) route via Tutzing cost only RM 5.10. For travelling in second class the LAG charged 3.40 RM, while on the State Railway via Tutzing 3.30 RM was required. In class IIIa it cost RM 2.20 on both routes and in class IIIb it cost 1.40 RM. For hikers, there was a so-called round-trip ticket. It cost 0.50 RM and included a tram ride from any stop in Munich to Grünwald, the reduction of the toll on the Großhesselohe bridge from 0.10 RM to 0.05 RM, the return from Höllriegelskreuth to Isartalbahnhof with the Isar Valley Railway and a return trip to any Munich tram stop. The LAG struggled initially in its negotiations with the state. From 1911, they were not taken over because of the strong opposition of the population. After the outbreak of the First World War, plans for nationalisation were rejected. Freight traffic remained relatively constant in the coming years; in 1910 the number of wagon loads was around 10,500. They usually carried wood or other agricultural products.

During World War I, the number of passengers carried fell again. From August to September 1914 the LAG had to borrow 100 carriages for the transport of soldiers for the state. In 1915 another 65 cars were acquired. On 16 January 1915, the LAG abolished first class on its trains. In the following years, the LAG made ever more losses on the Isar Valley Railway. Information about the performance of the line during the war years is limited because the LAG had to save the cost of paper. After the war, the carriages were in a very bad state because they were no longer waterproof. This also affected ridership. The Isar Valley Railway carried 2.3 million passengers in 1923. In 1926, passenger numbers dropped to 1.8 million people annually. Second class was operated in 1926 only on trains to Bichl. Parallel to the Isar Valley Railway, the German Post Office operated a post bus (Kraftpost, buses that also carried mail) service in 1929. In 1931, the number of trains was reduced. Passenger numbers fell further to 1.4 million passengers annually. In the LAG's annual report for 1932, the LAG wondered whether the operation on the Isar Valley Railway could continue because the line always recorded major losses. The State had rejected nationalisation. It was possible that the LAG would no longer be able to continue operations and that the Isar Valley Railway would have to be shut down. From 1 December 1932, only four pairs of trains ran daily between Munich and Wolfratshausen. In 1932, the loss was 375,816 Reichsmarks. In 1933, the requirement to seek higher fares was abolished by the State Railway due to the poor financial condition of the LAG. The municipalities along the Isar Valley Railway undertook to pay about 20,000 Reichsmarks for the maintenance of the Isar Valley Railway. The German Post Office additionally reduced the number of postal bus route running parallel. At the end of 1933, the Isar Valley Railway could operate eleven pairs of trains between Munich and Wolfratshausen again. Passenger traffic increased in the following years, but freight was affected by the increasing private transport.

=== Nationalisation and closure of individual sections ===
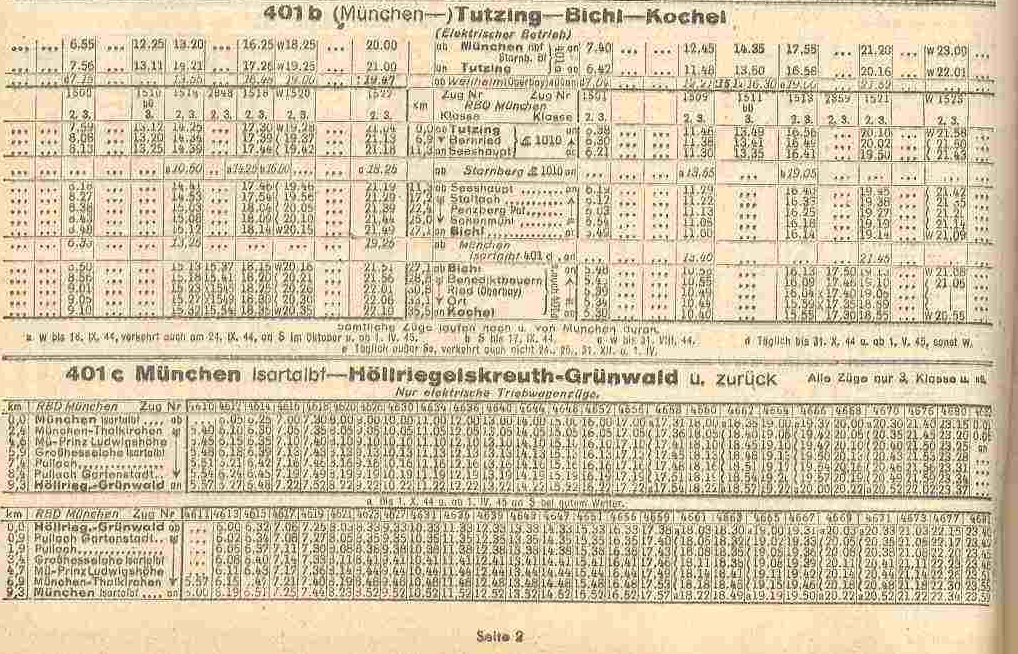
Extract from the timetable of 1944

The Deutsche Reichsbahn took over Lokalbahn AG, including the Isar Valley Railway, on 1 August 1938. The Isar Valley Railway was also involved in the plans for the reconstruction of the Munich railway network during the Nazi period. It would have served as a transit route to Italy. The plans were rejected shortly after the start of the Second World War. Traffic to and from the munitions factory in Geretsried increased freight traffic for a short time. The munitions factory was built in 1939 and connected by a rail siding to the Isar Valley Railway in Wolfratshausen. As the destruction of Munich increased, Deutsche Reichsbahn established a connection from the siding to the south, producing a triangular junction in Wolfratshausen, allowing freight trains to run via Bichl and Tutzing. The munitions plant was served daily by two or three freight trains. On 19 July 1944, 70 percent of the Isar Valley Railway was destroyed in an air raid by the United States Air Force. In order to transport freight from the munitions plant the Isar Valley Railway was restored to service provisionally, but due to the lack of spare parts only salt-impregnate sleepers could be used. After the Second World War, traffic on the Isar Valley Railway was restored to normal operations only slowly. Its rolling stock was stored or destroyed all over Germany. From 1946, regular passenger services were largely restored. After World War II, the volume of freight traffic fell again, passengers traffic briefly rose as a result of “hamster rides” (Hamsterfahrten: people, mostly women, travelling to the countryside to look for food).

On 8 October 1950, the connecting curve at Grosshesselohe Isartal station was opened. Some trains now ran on the curve directly to and from Munich Central Station (Hauptbahnhof). In the 1950s, Deutsche Bundesbahn planned to switch the electrical system from direct current to alternating current. On 25 March 1955, the rectifier failed at the Maria Einsiedel power station. In the following months, the line was therefore converted to AC operation earlier than planned, so that electrical operations could be resumed. On 27 September 1957, the initial Munich Central Station–Grosshesselohe Isartal station section was electrified and, in May 1960, the Höllriegelskreuth–Wolfratshausen section followed. From 29 June 1960, continuous electrical operations were possible between Munich and Wolfratshausen.

In the 1950s, losses of an average of 2.8 million Deutsche Marks were incurred each year on the Isar Valley Railway. The salt-impregnated sleepers rotted, so the speed limit of 60 km/h had to be reduced to 40 km/h and was shortly later reduced to 30 km/h. Since the rebuilding of the track was no longer worthwhile due to the low passenger numbers, Deutsche Bundesbahn decided in early 1958 to close the section from Beuerberg to Bichl. The section was closed on 31 May 1959, at the start of the summer timetable, for passengers and freight traffic and it was dismantled in December of the same year. From now on Deutsche Bundesbahn buses substituted for rail services.

In the early 1960s the city of Munich was planning the development of the Middle Ring, requiring the closure of the level crossing at Brudermühlstraße. Therefore, the city of Munich, presented an application for closing the section from Munich Isar Valley Railway station to Großhesselohe Isar Valley Railway station in 1963. Deutsche Bundesbahn rejected the application after a passenger survey, however, because it considered the maintenance of passenger operations worthwhile. When Deutsche Bundesbahn was given approval to build the S-Bahn trunk line and the city had to abandon plans to build a U-Bahn line on the same route, DB agreed to the closure of the level crossing. Accordingly, DB closed passenger services on the section of the line on 31 May 1964. Henceforth, all passenger services ran on the connecting curve at Großhesselohe. In 1970, the overhead line was dismantled between Munich South and Großhesselohe and the second track was demolished. The level crossing at Brudermühlstraße was also removed. The freight left on the Großhesselohe–Thalkirchen section and between Munich South and Heizkraftwerk Süd (combined heat and power station south) served several companies. On 27 May 1972, the section from Wolfratshausen to Beuerberg was closed due to declining passenger numbers and also replaced by DB buses.

=== Integration with the Munich S-Bahn ===
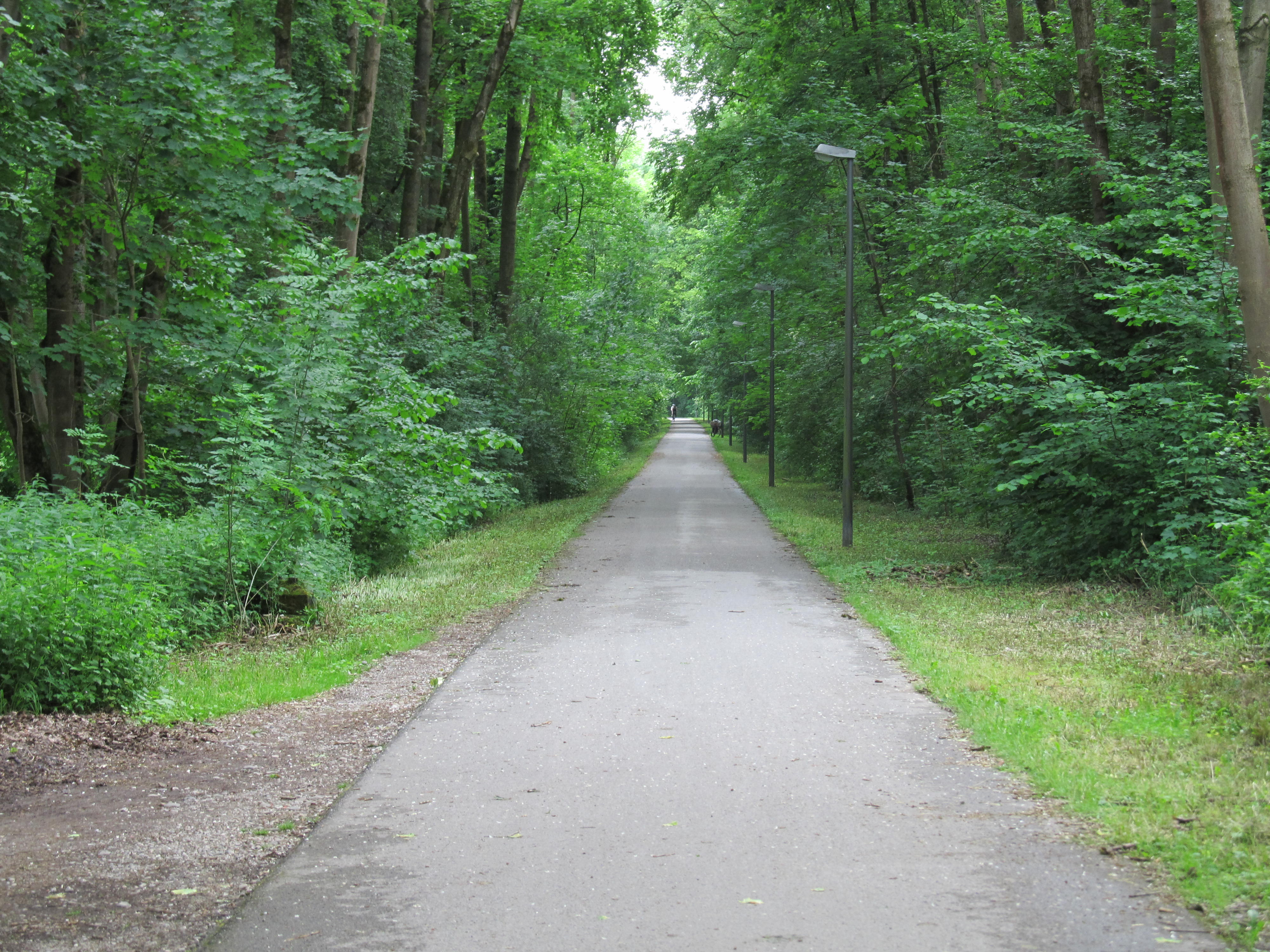
Isar Valley Railway near Maria-Einsiedel

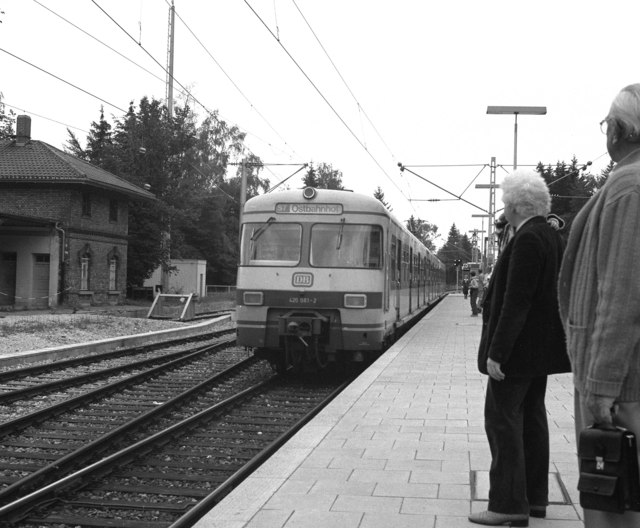
EMU of class 420 on 31 August 1982 in Großhesselohe

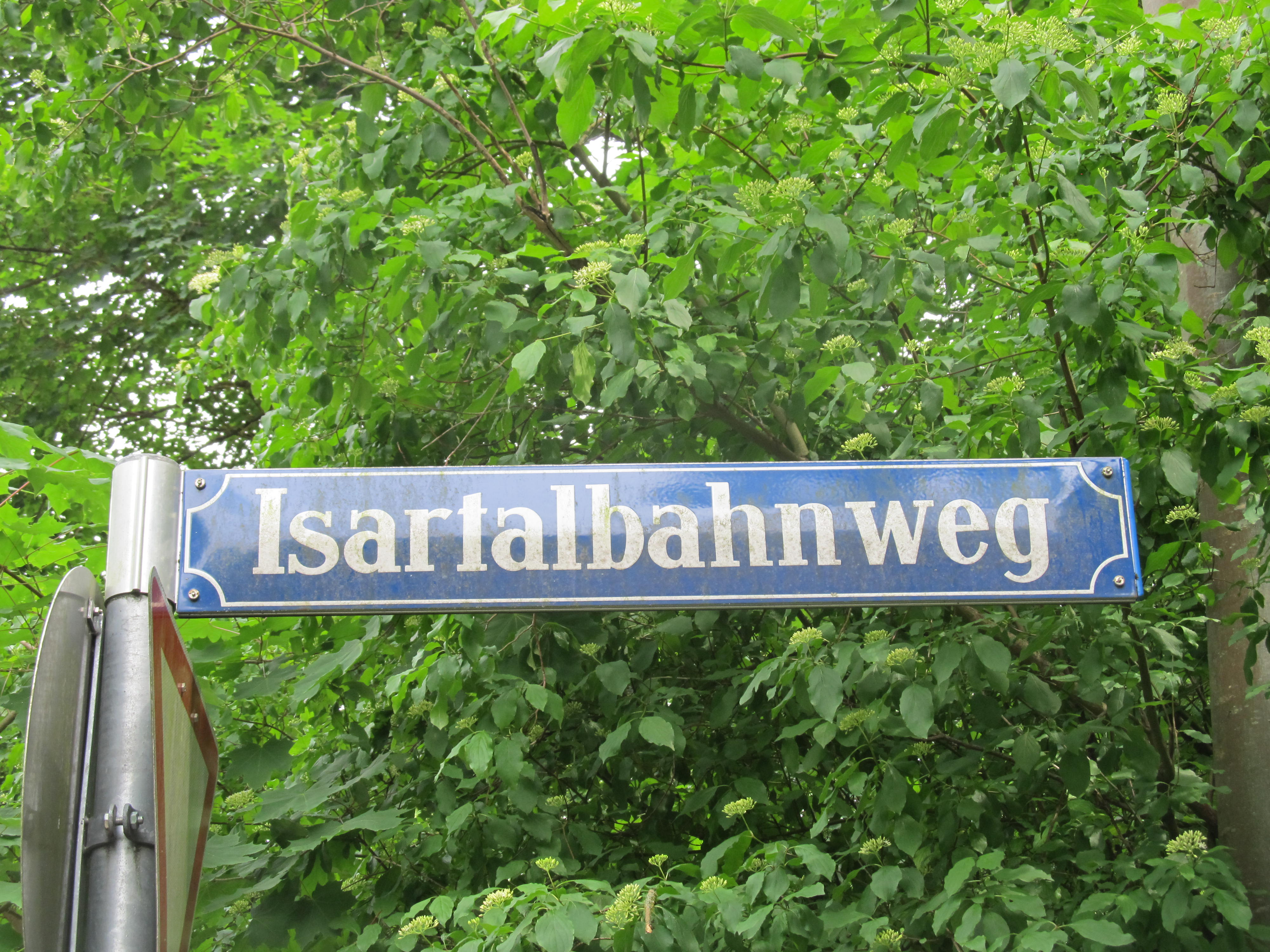
Street sign of the Isar Valley Railway trail

In 1970, the platforms between Grosshesselohe Isartal station and Wolfratshausen were raised to a height of 76 centimetres in preparation for S-Bahn operations. On 28 May 1972, S-Bahn services began between the Holzkirchen wing station (Holzkirchner Flügelbahnhof) of Munich Hauptbahnhof and Wolfratshausen and at the same time the line was also integrated in the Münchner Verkehrs- und Tarifverbund (Munich Transport and Tariff Association, MVV). The service, called line S 10, offered no direct connection to the new S-Bahn trunk line, so passengers had to change trains at the Central Station. On 31 May 1981, the construction of the Southern lines tunnel (Südstreckentunnel) at München Donnersbergerbrücke station connected the line to the S-Bahn trunk line and the S 10 service was replaced by line S 7. At the same time Deutsche Bundesbahn built a connecting curve with two tracks from Großhesselohe, which allowed the S 7 service to run at 20-minute intervals.

In 1989, Deutsche Bundesbahn abandoned operations between Großhesselohe and Thalkirchen. In 1998 the track was dismantled, although next to Schäftlarnstraße some rails are still visible. The former Isar Valley Railway Station (Isartalbahnhof) in the Wholesale Market Munich is closed. The regional office of the Munich Johanniter-Unfall-Hilfe ("St John's Accident Assistance") uses the brick station building on the Schäftlarnstraße, located between the railway line, the Heizkraftwerk Süd power station and the wholesale market, partly as an ambulance station. The bridge over the Schäftlarnstraße, the former connecting curve between the Isartalbahnhof and Munich South station is still preserved. The superstructure was completely renovated in 2008. The remains of the branch line runs as a siding past the Isartalbahnhof and nowadays serves as a connection to the power station.

Approximately two kilometres of the path of the line between Benediktbeuerer Straße near Asam-Schlössl and the junction of Großhesseloher Straße and Knotestraße has been used since 1 April 2001 as a paved rail trail for cycling. Similarly, on the southern section between Wolfratshausen and Beuerberg a roughly nine kilometre section has and also been converted into a paved trail.

== Route ==
The Isar Valley Railway originally began at the foot of the embankment of the Munich South Ring where the Isar Valley Railway station (Isartalbahnhof) lies. The line ran in the valley of the Isar to Thalkirchen station. The route continued with a slight gradient of 0.4 percent to Maria Einsiedel station. Before Prinz-Ludwigshöhe station the line rose again at 2.0 percent. At the 5.5 kilometre mark, 450 metres before Grosshesselohe Isartal station, there is a bridge over the Munich–Holzkirchen railway. Before Grosshesselohe Isartal station there is a connecting curve to the Munich–Holzkirchen line. The line, which from here is still in operation, runs to Ebenhausen relatively directly over a plane. Shortly after Ebenhausen the highest point of the track is reached at approximately 665 metres above sea level. The line runs downhill to Icking. After Icking station the slope in the so-called Schlederleite section is greater and reaches up to 3.3 percent. In this area, there are numerous curves. The line leaves the Isar valley and continues up the Loisach valley. After crossing the Loisach over a 150-metre-long (490 ft) bridge, the line is reaches its current end point at Wolfratshausen station. A siding branches at Wolfratshausen to Geretsried. The abandoned line to Bichl was largely flat. Before Degerndorf the line crossed a bridge over the Loisach. In Beuerberg the line left the valley, but returned shortly afterwards. In Fletzen it crossed the Loisach over a bridge once more. Just before Bichl it reached the Kochelsee Railway (Kochelseebahn). The former end of the line in Bichl was at 50.6 kilometres from the start in Munich.

== Operations ==
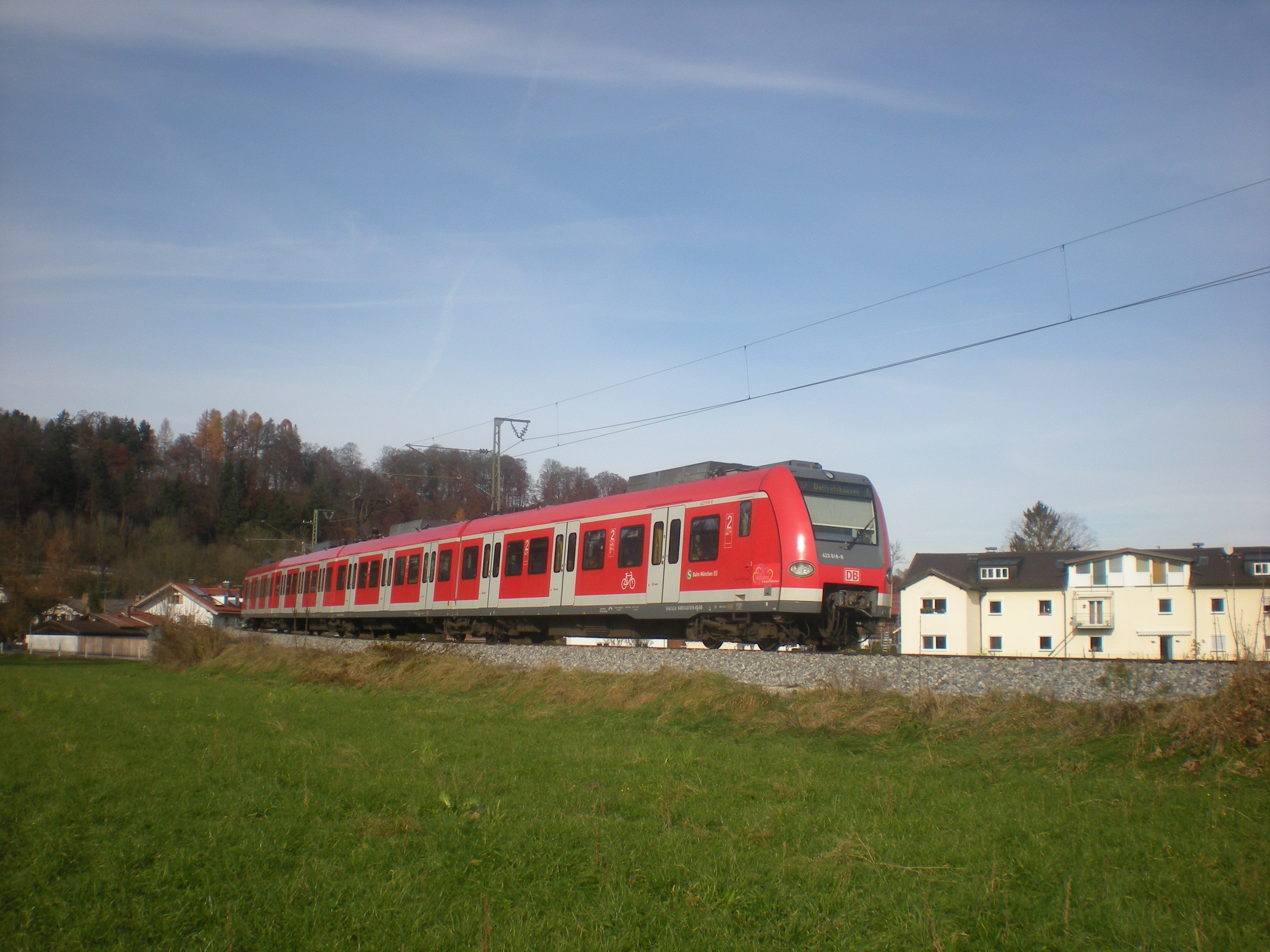
S-Bahn EMU of class 423 near Wolfratshausen

Until 2001, the Isar Valley Railway were operated by class 420 electric multiple units. From 2001 to 2003 these vehicles were replaced by new EMUs of class 423; S 7 was the first Munich S-Bahn line that the class 423s ran on. All traffic of the remaining part of the Isar Valley Railway currently operates with this class. Various shunting engines are used for freight traffic.

== Future ==
The planned extension of line S 7 from Wolfratshausen to Geretsried would reactivate a small part of the former route in the city of Wolfratshausen. Line S 7 would be extended via Gelting station to Geretsried and two stations would be built in Geretsried, provisionally called Geretsried Süd (south) and Geretsried Mitte (central). Deutsche Bahn initiated the planning approval process in 2010 and it was scheduled for completion in 2013. The construction period was estimated to take three years and construction was scheduled to begin in 2013. These plans changed. According to the mayor of Geretsried in November 2013, discussions with the Government of Upper Bavaria would begin in April 2014. In this process, 760 objections to the plans for the S-Bahn extension would be considered. The government expects to complete the planning approval process in 2015. In the following years, land acquisition and the financing of €120 million project would be carried out. Following this schedule, the construction of the nine kilometre route would start in 2018. The line would then be opened in 2022.
