= DBAG Class 423 =

German train type

DBAG Class 423/433
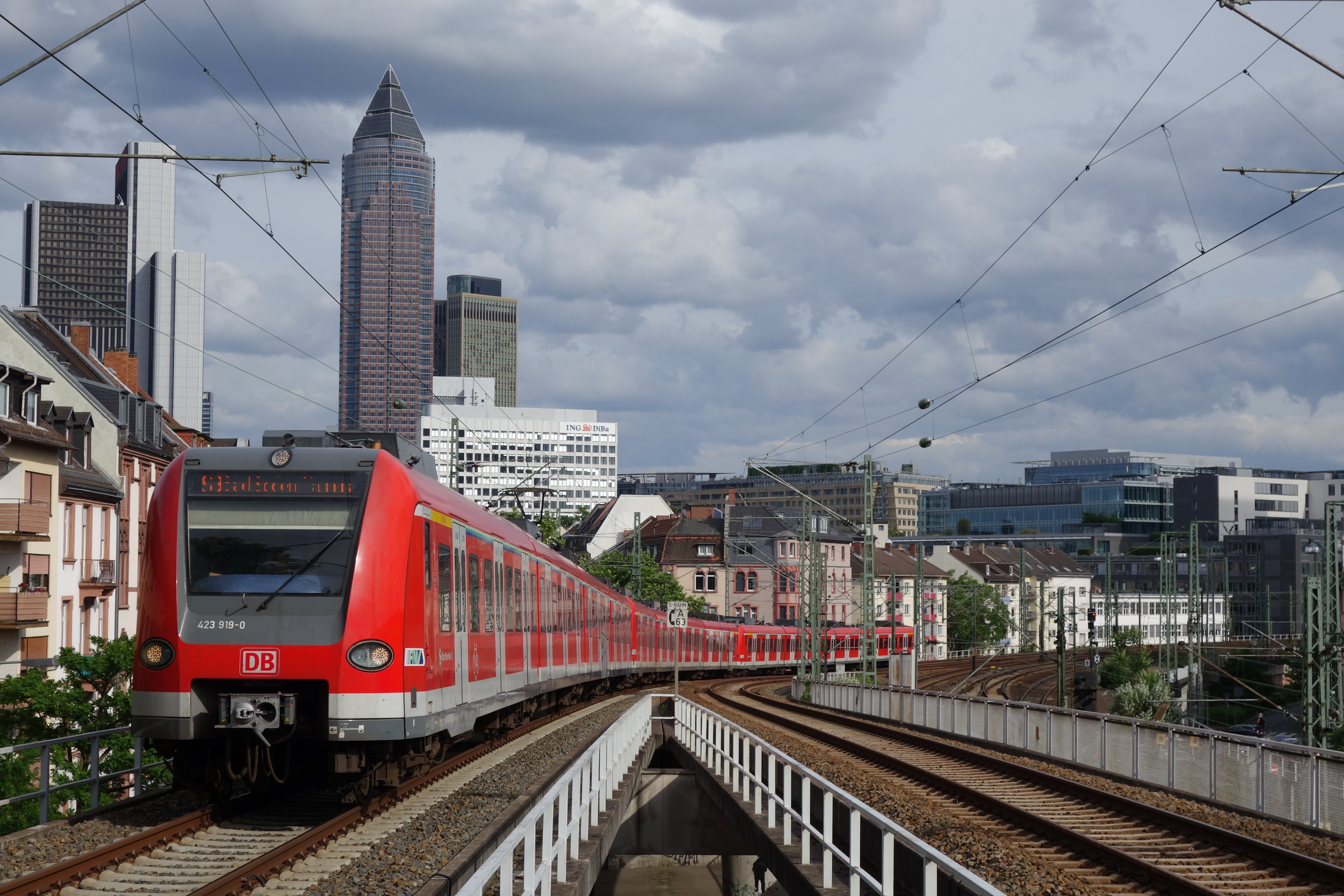
- Three coupled Class 423 at Frankfurt West station
- Manufacturers: Adtranz/Bombardier, Alstom LHB & ABB consortium
- Constructed: 1998 - 2007
- Number built: 462
- Predecessor: Class 420
- Successor: Class 422, Class 430
- Operator: DB Regio
- Lines served: Munich S-Bahn, Cologne S-Bahn, Frankfurt S-Bahn, Stuttgart S-Bahn

Specifications
- Train length: 67,400 mm (221 ft 1 9/16 in)
- Floor height: 1,025 mm (40.4 in)
- Wheel diameter: 850 mm (33.46 in)
- Wheelbase: Jacobs bogie: 2,700 mm (8 ft 10 5/16 in)
- Maximum speed: 140 km/h (87 mph)
- Weight: 105 t (103 long tons; 116 short tons)
- Traction system: Electric (ADtranz GTO/IGBT-VVVF)
- Traction motors: 8× ADtranz 4WIA 3558G (4-pole asynchronous)
- Power output: 2,350 kW (3,150 hp)
- Gear ratio: 1 : 6,33
- Electric system: 15 kV 16.7 Hz AC
- Current collection: Pantograph
- UIC classification: Bo′(Bo′)(2′)(Bo′)Bo′
- Track gauge: 1,435 mm (4 ft 8 1/2 in) standard gauge

The Deutsche Bahn Class 423 EMU is a light-weight articulated electric railcar for S-Bahn commuter networks in Germany. The train has similar dimensions to its predecessor, the Class 420 EMU, but is significantly lighter and has one large passenger compartment, while that of the 420 is divided into three parts. The 423 additionally has six doors in each carriage (three on each side), which is down from eight on the 420 (four on each side). They are numbered from 423 001 to 423 462.

Both Munich and Frankfurt ordered Class 423s for their S-Bahn systems; they were delivered between 1999 and 2004. The 423 has spawned a family of slightly modified designs ordered for S-Bahns across Germany: the Class 422, Class 424, Class 425/426 and Class 430.

== Description ==
A Class 423 unit consists of four cars that share three jacobs bogies and can only be separated at maintenance facilities. The inner two cars are designated as Class 433. A 423 unit typically consists of the following cars, where x is the unit's number:

- 423 x
- 433 x
- 433 (x+500)
- 423 (x+500)

e.g. 423 194 + 433 194 + 433 694 + 423 694. Different consists usually occur when the remains of partially destroyed units are combined to form one intact EMU.

Two short trains form a "full train", three short trains form a "long train".

One can see through from one end to the other of the vehicle, and in the original design a lockable door was installed in the middle of the railcar to allow part of the vehicle to be left empty during periods of low demand in order to maintain greater social control through denser occupancy. The railcars have a passenger information system inside, which alternately displays the destination stop and the next stop and is supplemented by a one-time acoustic announcement of the next stop. Furthermore, an announcement is made on which side it will be possible to get off. They are also equipped with a technical check-in system, whereby the driver does not have to monitor the doors himself; this is done by light barriers. In 2007, however, this procedure was temporarily taken out of service until light grids were retrofitted over almost the entire height of the boarding area.

The three-light headlight can be switched from low beam to high beam during operation. Some railcars (423 238 and 423 268 of the Munich S-Bahn) were in operation with LED headlights instead of normal beam headlights, in which the light from green and red LEDs was mixed to achieve a more balanced spectral distribution. With the modernization, all vehicles were converted to warm white LED modules.

The openings of the twelve doors per side[2] are 1300 mm wide.

Electronic pushbuttons that signal door release with a few LEDs and respond to mechanical pressure are used to open the door. The original pushbuttons, which had a pressure surface the size of a thumb, only provided visual feedback on contact. In March 2012, new pushbuttons were installed in multiple unit 423 089 of the Munich S-Bahn for testing purposes. In contrast, these pushbuttons functioned capacitively (in Munich, these pushbuttons are also found in all city buses as well as newer subways and streetcars). In the course of modernization, the vehicles were fitted with pushbuttons with a larger pressure surface, an illuminated ring and audible and perceptible actuation.

The series was delivered in five construction series:

- 1st series: 423 001 - 423 190
- 2nd series: 423 191 - 423 305
- 3rd series: 423 306 - 423 371
- 4th series: 423 372 - 423 396
- 5th series: 423 397 - 423 462

The last vehicles 423 444 - 456, which were already built in 2007, were not put into service until the beginning of 2010 due to problems with the door safety system.

Based on the class 423, the class 422 was delivered as successor from 2008 to 2010. Its new vehicle head increased the length of a multiple unit by two meters compared to the 420 and 423 series. Derived from the 422 series, the 430 series has been delivered since 2012, which is only 90 centimeters longer than the 420 and 423 series and thus also fits as a long train on 210 meter long platforms.

== Technology ==
Schematic side view of a DBAG Class 423 rail

The multiple units are powered by eight four-pole, water-cooled three-phase asynchronous traction motors with a total output of 2350 kilowatts. The trains' two traction systems, which are supplied with power via a common pantograph, are largely independent of one another.

The first series (423 001 - 423 190) uses GTO inverters while series 2 to 5 use IGBT inverters. As a result, the traction motor sound of the IGBT units produce a higher pitched sound.

Each train has two central control units. Data is exchanged within the trains via a multifunction vehicle bus, and within the train set via a wire train bus with a maximum transmission rate of one megabit per second. The wire train bus is also used for automatic configuration of the train set. The trains are equipped with an emergency brake.

The trains have an emergency brake override.

Service braking is performed by electrodynamic brakes. Of the 16 brake cylinders of the electro-pneumatic brake, six are equipped with a spring accumulator.

== Gallery ==
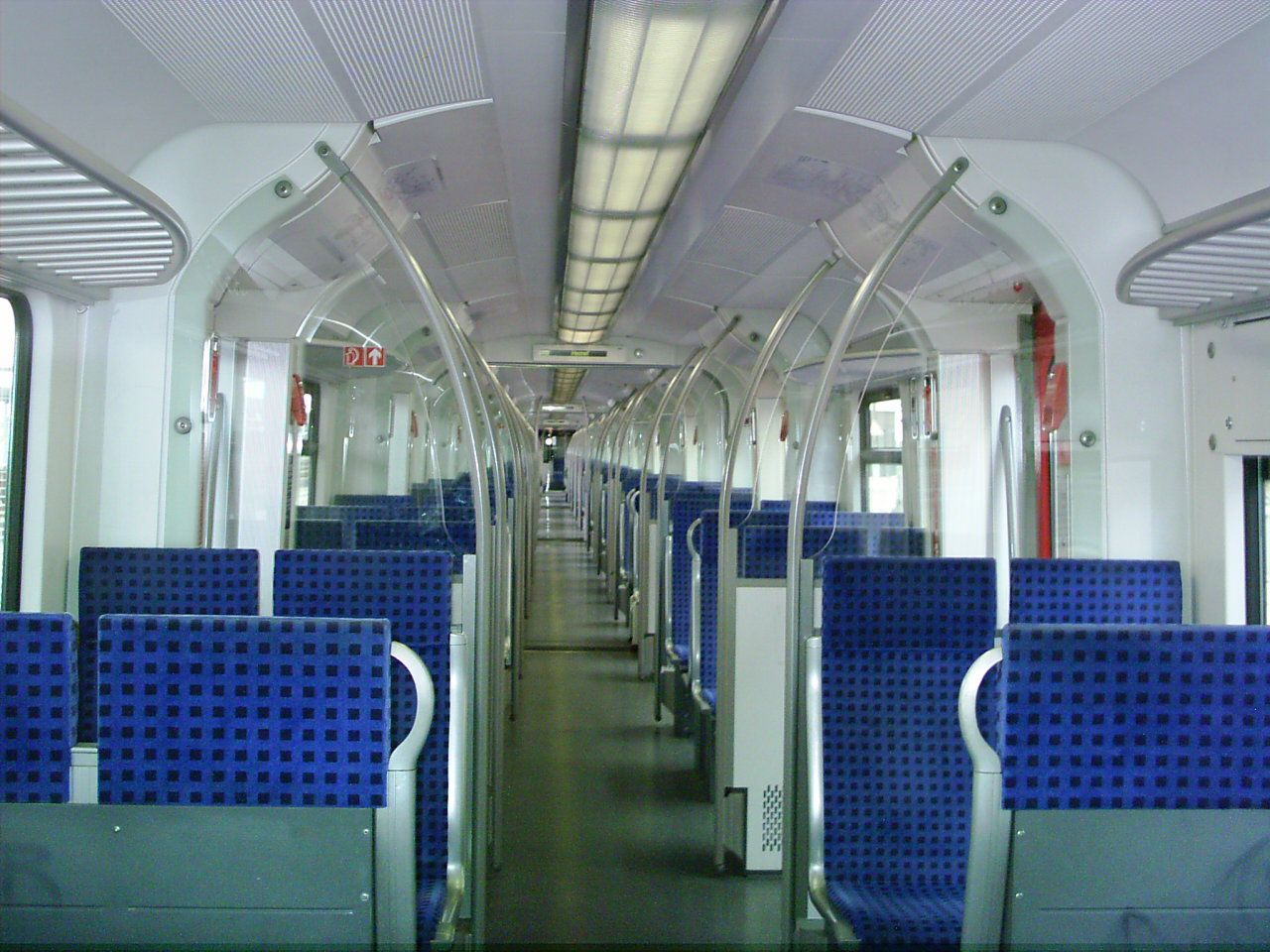
Interior

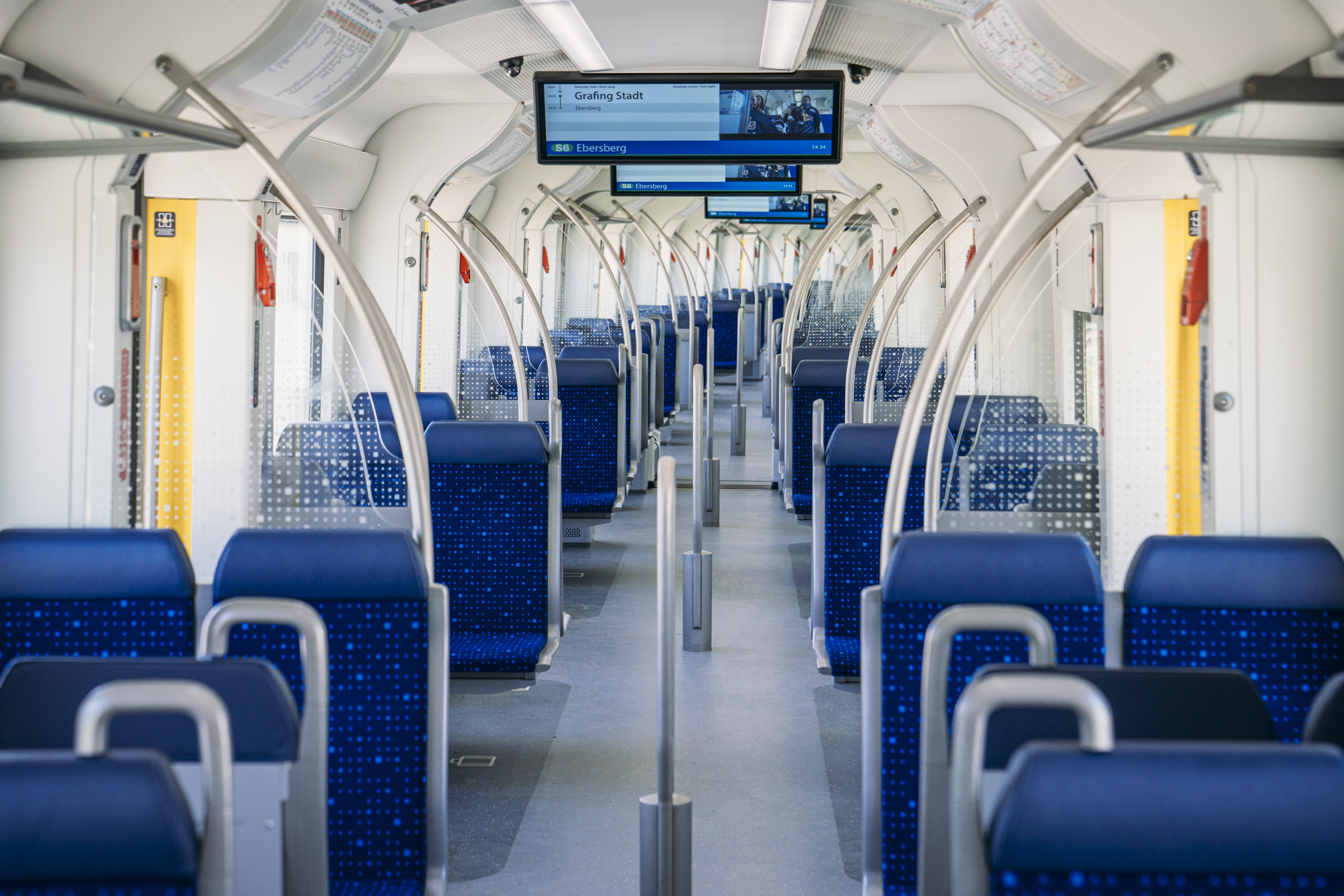
Refurbished Interior (Munich S-Bahn)

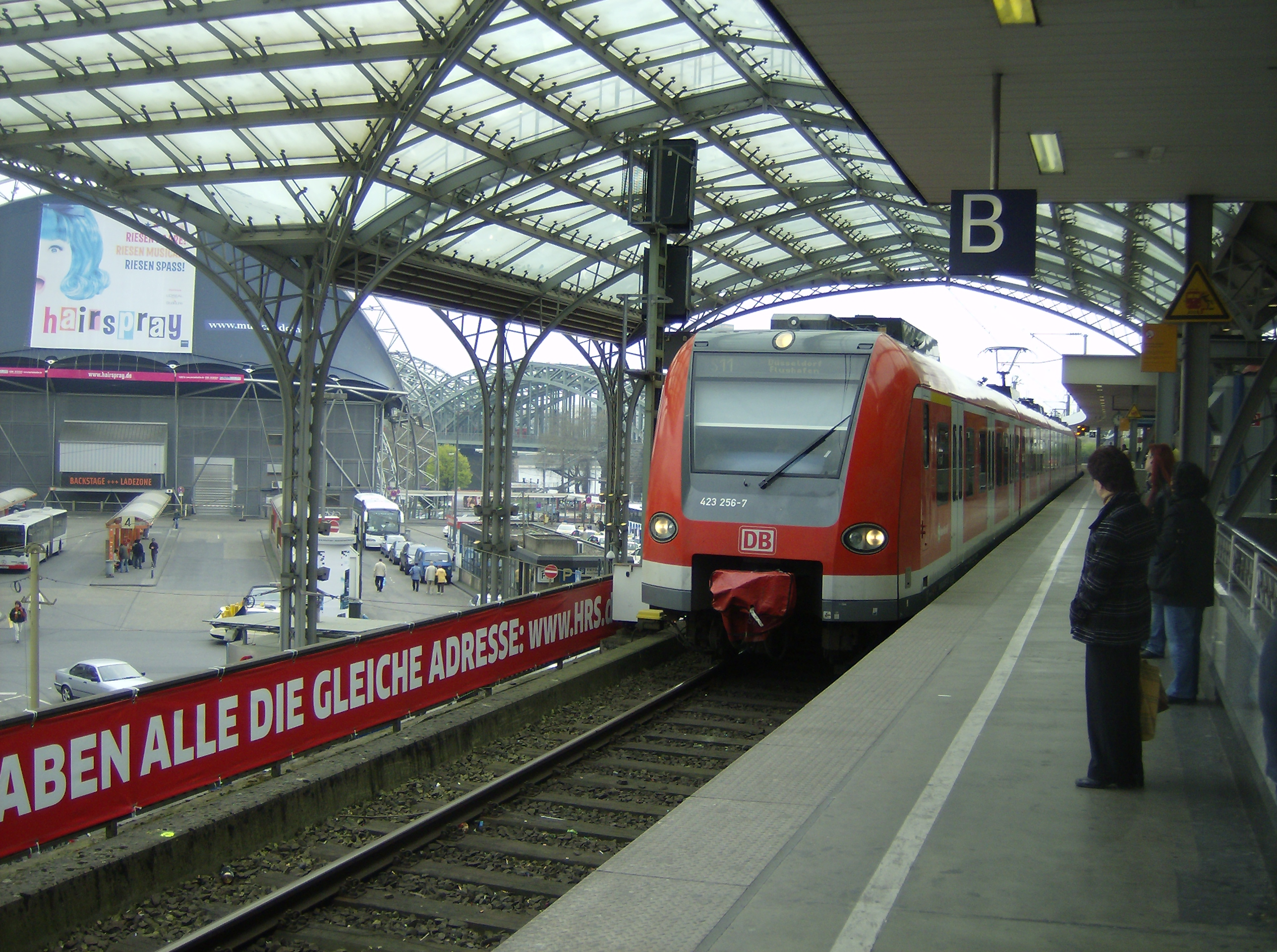
423 256 arriving at Köln Hbf

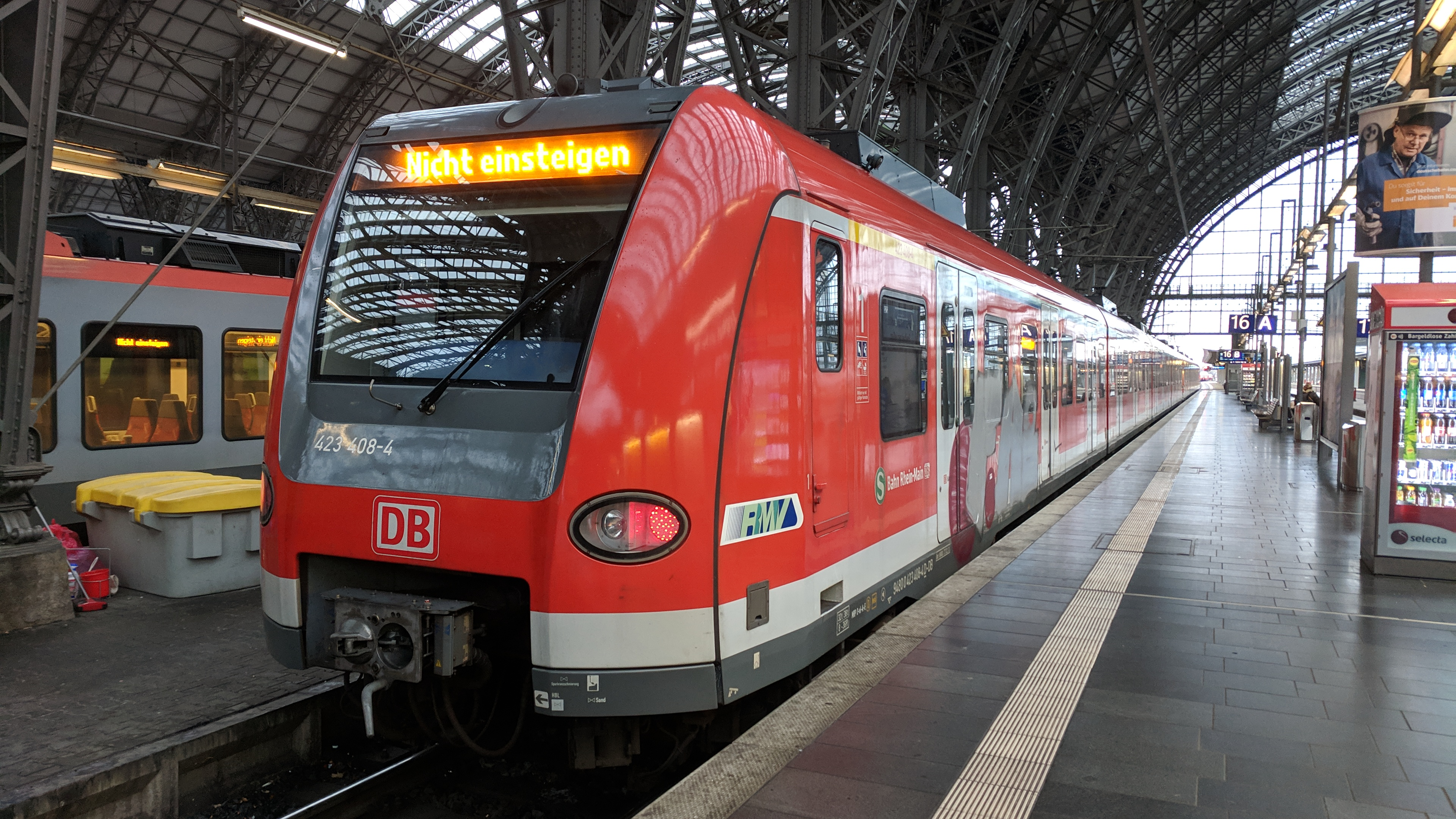
423 408 at Frankfurt am Main Hbf

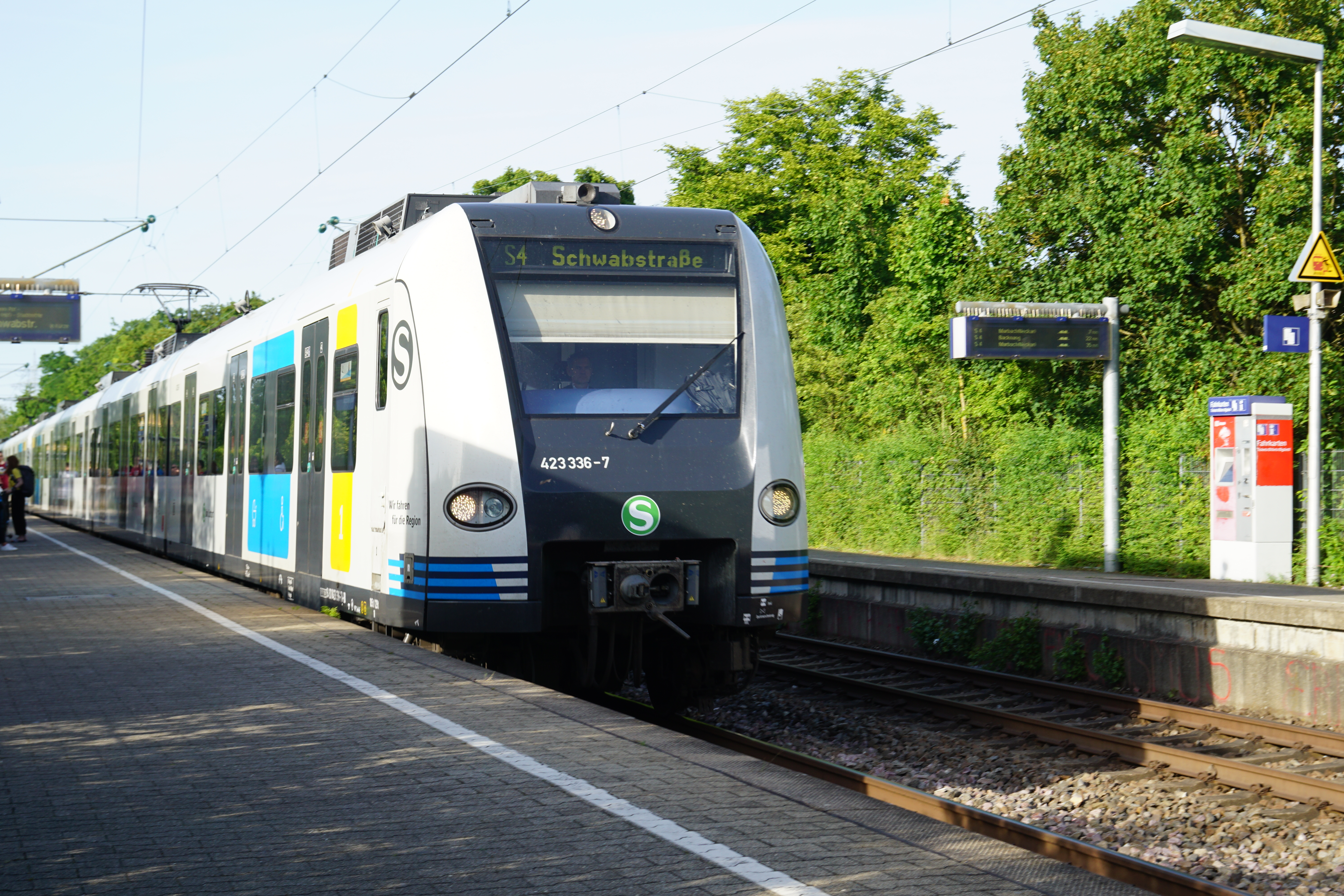
423 336 at Favoritepark S-Bahn Station
