= 422 class =

422 class or Class 422 may refer to:

- DBAG Class 422, the German EMU
- FS Class 422, the Prussian locomotive
- New South Wales 422 class locomotive
