= DBAG Class 430 =

German electric railcar

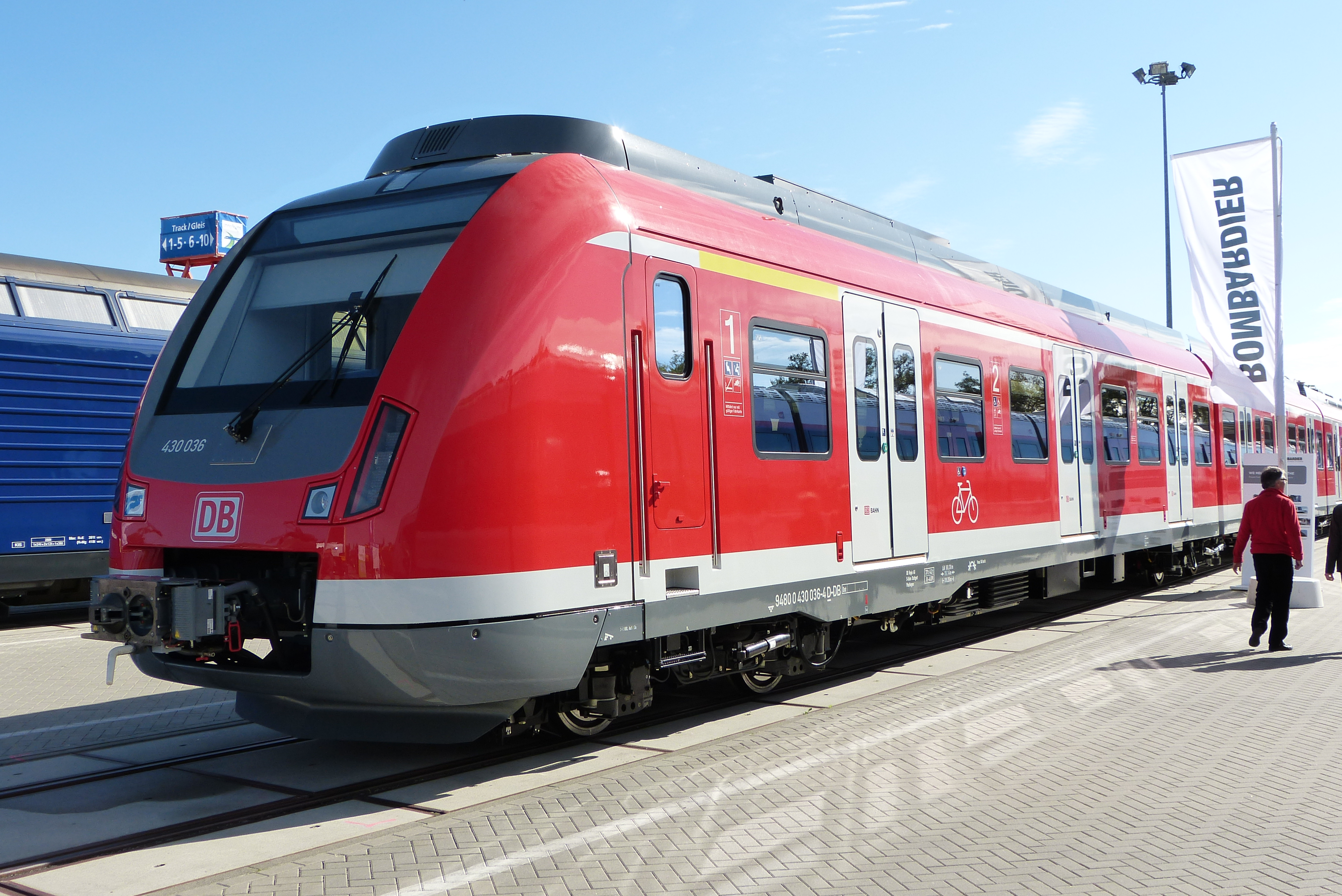
- Display of Class 430 at InnoTrans 2012

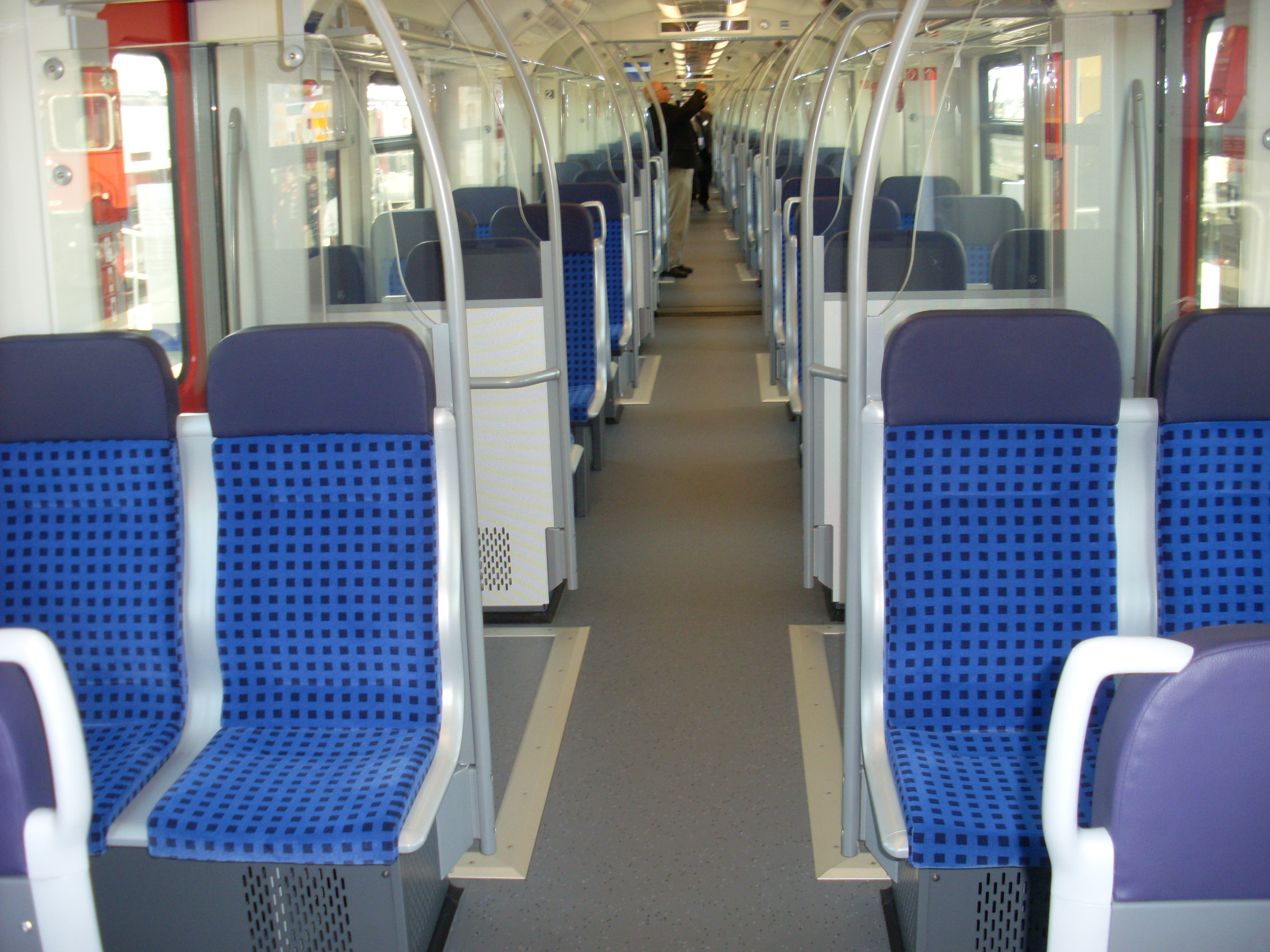
- Interior of Class 430
- In service: 2012-
- Manufacturers: Alstom, Bombardier
- Built at: Salzgitter, Hennigsdorf, Aachen
- Replaced: DB Class 420
- Constructed: 2011?
- Entered service: 2012-present
- Number under construction: 178 (ordered)
- Formation: 68.3 metres (224 ft 1 in)
- Capacity: 184 seats (including 16 folding seats) in Stuttgart. 176 seats in Rhine-Main. 296 standing
- Operators: VVS, RMV

Specifications
- Train length: 68.3 metres (224 ft 1 in); 136.6 metres (448 ft 2 in); 204.9 metres (672 ft 3 in)
- Width: 3.02 metres (9 ft 11 in)
- Height: 4.273 metres (14 ft 0.2 in)
- Floor height: 1.03 metres (41 in)
- Entry: level
- Wheelbase: 2.2 metres (7 ft 3 in) (cab cars); 2.7 metres (8 ft 10 in) (trailers)
- Maximum speed: 140 kilometres per hour (87 mph)
- Weight: 119 metric tons (131 short tons)
- Traction system: Three-phase asynchronous
- Power output: 2,350 kilowatts (3,150 hp)
- HVAC: heating, air conditioning
- Electric system: 15 kV, 16.7 Hz
- Current collection: pantograph
- UIC classification: Bo′(Bo′)(2′)(Bo′)Bo′
- Braking systems: service brakes, track brakes
- Safety system: Bombardier EBI Cab 500
- Coupling system: Scharfenberg
- Track gauge: 1,435 mm (4 ft 8 1/2 in) standard gauge

The Class 430 EMU is an electric railcar for S-Bahn commuter networks in Germany, jointly developed by Bombardier and Alstom. The first trains went into service in 2012, replacing the Class 420 EMUs of the Stuttgart S-Bahn.

== Deployment ==
=== Stuttgart ===
In February 2009 it was announced that the 90 remaining Class 420 EMUs would be replaced by 83 newly developed Class 430 EMUs. This would be the first use of Class 430s in Germany. In May 2009, DB Regio ordered 83 trains, which are expected to be delivered between February and December 2012. DB has an option to order another 83 units. In December 2010, the option was increased from 83 to 166 units for the Rhine-Ruhr S-Bahn (see below). In October 2011, the Transport Committee of the Stuttgart Region decided to order 4 more Class 430s to cover additional services.

=== Rhine-Ruhr ===
In December 2009, the Verkehrsverbund Rhein-Ruhr announced that the Class 430 would be used, with deliveries to be completed by the end of 2012. This would give 116 vehicles total of both Class 422 and Class 430. In April 2011, it was announced that orders for additional vehicles had been canceled, due to the upcoming tender of lines S5 and S8. On those lines, the existing locomotive-hauled trains will be replaced by Class 422, rather than Class 430.

=== Rhine-Main ===
In November 2011, the Rhein-Main-Verkehrsverbund announced that after the successful tender of the S-Bahn network, Class 430 would replace the current Class 420 at the 2014/2015 timetable change. This is part of the contract between the Verkehrsverbund and DB. In December 2011, DB and Bombardier announced that DB had ordered 90 vehicles. In early 2014, these trains will be used for testing and training purposes in the Frankfurt area.

== Technology and equipment ==
S4 (DBAG Class 430) at station in Eschborn, direction to Kronberg im Taunus

The walk-through multiple units of Class 430 are similar to those of the Class 422. They have an air-conditioned passenger area, and have gap bridging to prevent entry and exit accidents. The vehicles for Stuttgart are equipped with 16 surveillance cameras per train, glass shelves, and LED lighting. They offer eight screens in each train which only display information about the next station. If the supporting data is available, by 2013 they will also be able to display information about connections.

The Class 430 has lower noise at startup than the Class 423 used in Stuttgart. It also has less energy consumption than the Class 420.

Each train will have a length of 68.3 metres (224 ft 1 in) - 0.9 metres (2 ft 11 in) longer than the Class 423, but 1.1 metres (3 ft 7 in) shorter than the Class 422. The cab meets the EN 15227 standard (requirements for crashworthiness for railway vehicle bodies) and is therefore longer than that of the corresponding Class 423. The Class 430 is shorter than the class 422 because in the middle car, a single row of seats replaced a double row, allowing the car to be shorter. This was required because trains must fit alongside a 210-metre-long (689 ft 0 in) platform; with three units coupled together, the Class 430 will have a length of 204.9 metres (672 ft 3 in). The trains have magnetic track brakes. The driver has two options for controlling the doors: first, the driver can unlock the doors on the platform side, and the passengers open the doors themselves with a pushbutton (as in the Class 423); second, the driver can unlock and open all of the doors on the platform side at once. The trains have more opening windows than the class 423, and larger information displays in the vestibules, similar to those on the Class 425. The information displays on the outside of the train are twice as big. The seats are in the standard DB colors, but with leather headrests. The seatbacks are ergonomically shaped and padded.

== Production ==
The first trains will be made by the consortium of Alstom in Salzgitter and Bombardier in Hennigsdorf. As of 2010, there are 29 trains being built in Salzgitter, and 54 more will be produced at Bombardier in Aachen. Nine vehicles will be intensively tested over 50,000 kilometres (31,000 mi).
