= DB Class 420 =

German S-Bahn train type

Class 420 / SL X420
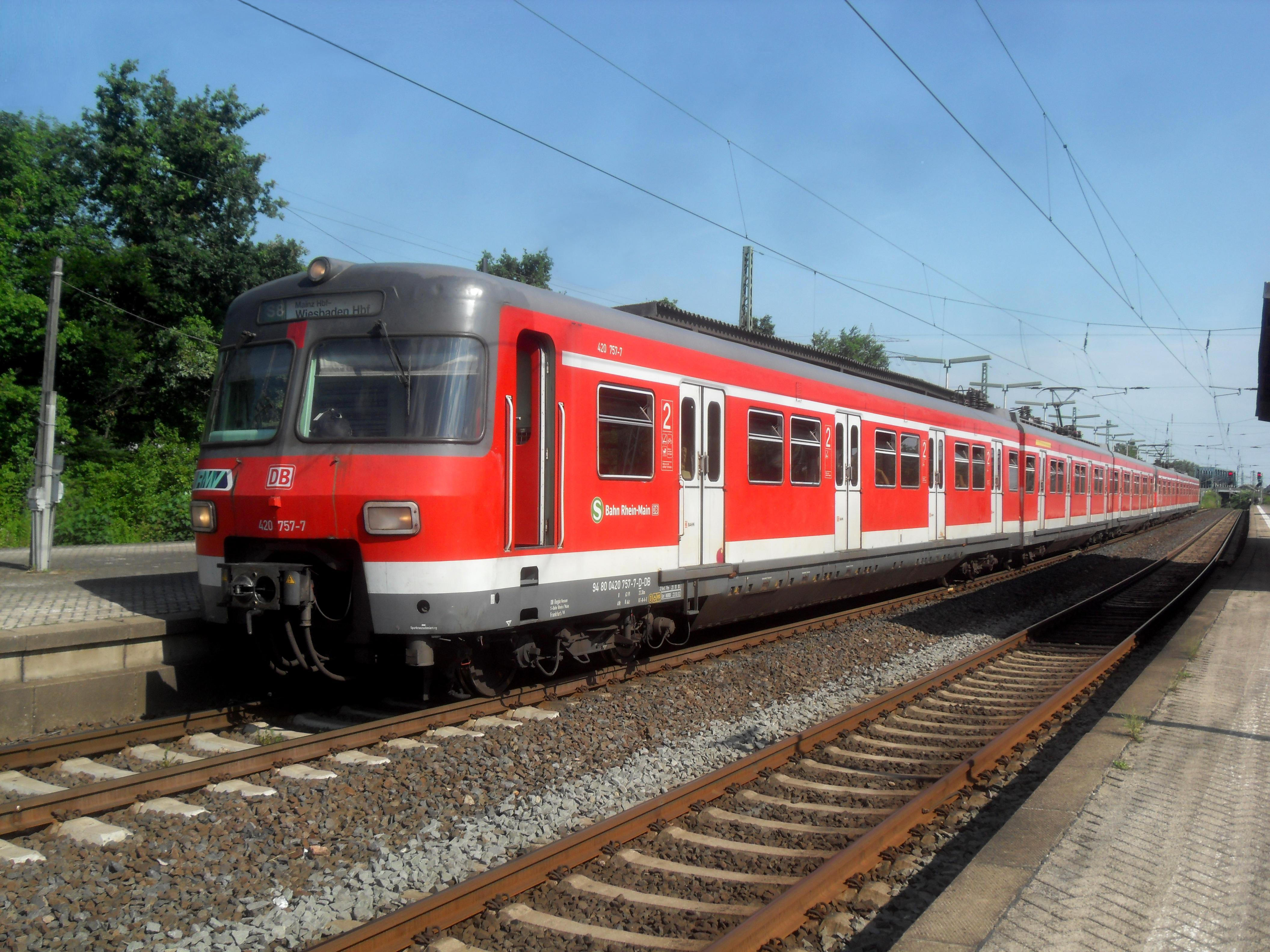
- A Class 420 train at Wiesbaden Ost station in June 2010
- Manufacturers: LHB, MBB, Orenstein & Koppel, Uerdingen, Waggon Union
- Constructed: 1969–1997
- Number built: 1,440 vehicles (480 sets)
- Number preserved: 16 vehicles
- Successor: DB Class 423, DBAG Class 430
- Formation: 3 cars per trainset
- Fleet numbers: 420 001–420 390; 420 400–420 489
- Operators: Deutsche Bundesbahn; Deutsche Bahn; Storstockholms Lokaltrafik
- Lines served: Munich S-Bahn network; Stuttgart S-Bahn network; Rhine-Main S-Bahn network; Rhine-Ruhr S-Bahn network; Stockholm commuter rail network

Specifications
- Car body construction: Aluminium, steel
- Train length: 67,400 mm (221 ft 2 in)
- Width: 2,900 mm (9 ft 6 in)
- Floor height: 1,000 mm (3 ft 3 in)
- Doors: 4 pairs per side
- Maximum speed: 120 km/h (75 mph)
- Weight: 1,398 t (1,376 long tons; 1,541 short tons) (with steel end cars); 129 t (127 long tons; 142 short tons), 135 t (133 long tons; 149 short tons)
- Power output: 2,400 kW (3,218 hp)
- Acceleration: 1.0 m/s^{2} (2.2 mph/s)
- Deceleration: 0.9 m/s^{2} (2.0 mph/s)
- Electric system: 15 kV 16.7 Hz AC overhead line
- Current collection: Single-arm pantograph
- Braking systems: Resistor brake, air-disc brake spring-accumulator brake (from 7. batch onwards)
- Safety systems: ATP (SL X420); LZB (Munich S-Bahn)
- Track gauge: 1,435 mm (4 ft 8 1/2 in)

Notes/references

The Class 420 (German: Baureihe 420) is a commuter electric multiple unit train type in service on German S-Bahn networks since 1972. Their use in Munich during the 1972 Summer Olympics earned them the colloquial name Olympiatriebwagen (Olympic multiple unit).

== Design ==
=== Livery variations ===
Each of the three prototype sets received a different livery. 420 001 had an orange and white livery, 420 002 had a blue and white livery, and 420 003 wine-red and white livery. A public poll over the livery of the S-Bahn trains was held in Frankfurt, Munich and Düsseldorf. Munich received blue trains, Düsseldorf chose orange and Frankfurt also received orange liveried trains due to economic reasons, despite opting for the red livery.

Units used on Munich S-Bahn services to the airport received a light blue livery.

All units still in service were repainted into the traffic-red livery.

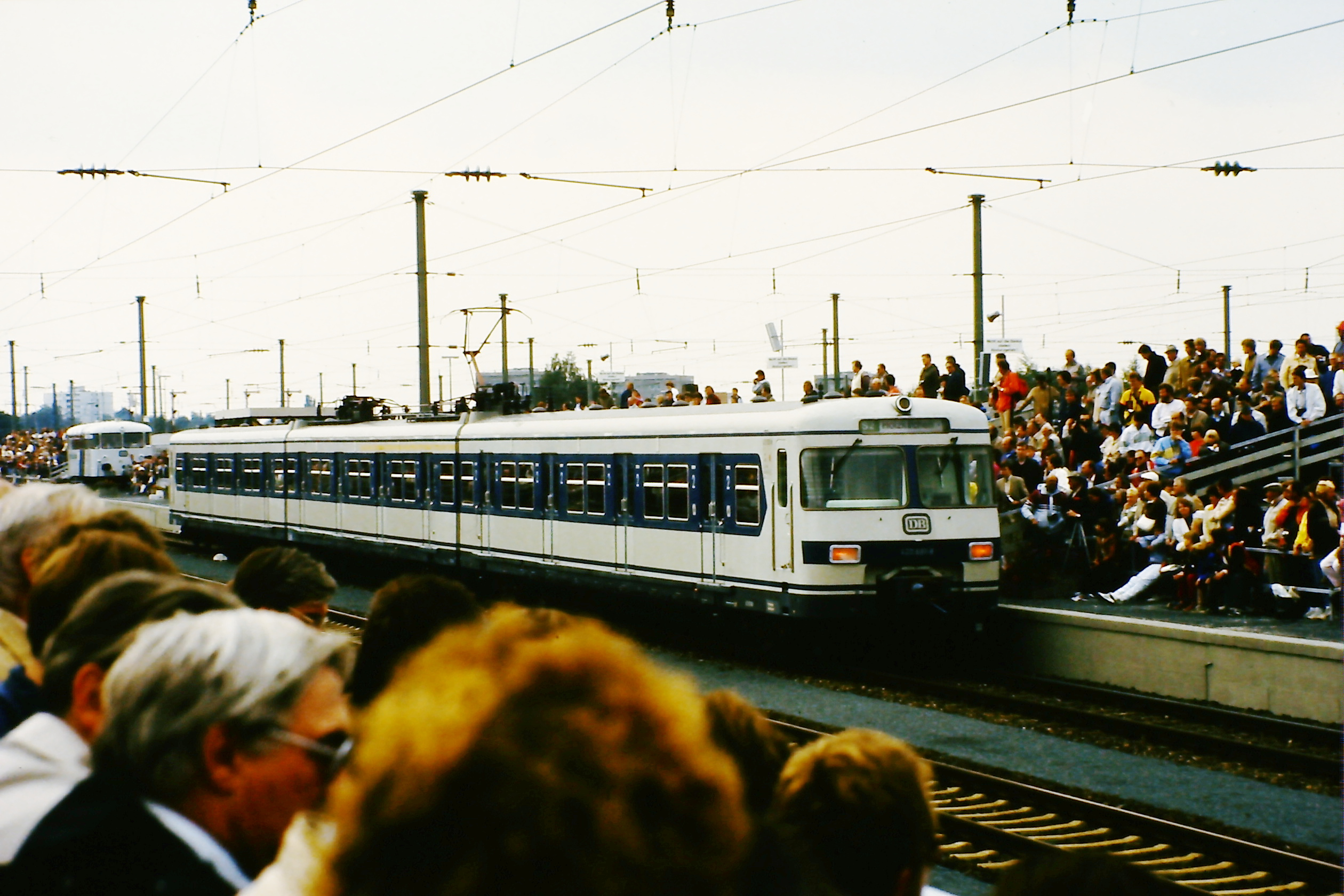
Munich S-Bahn 420 in blue and white livery

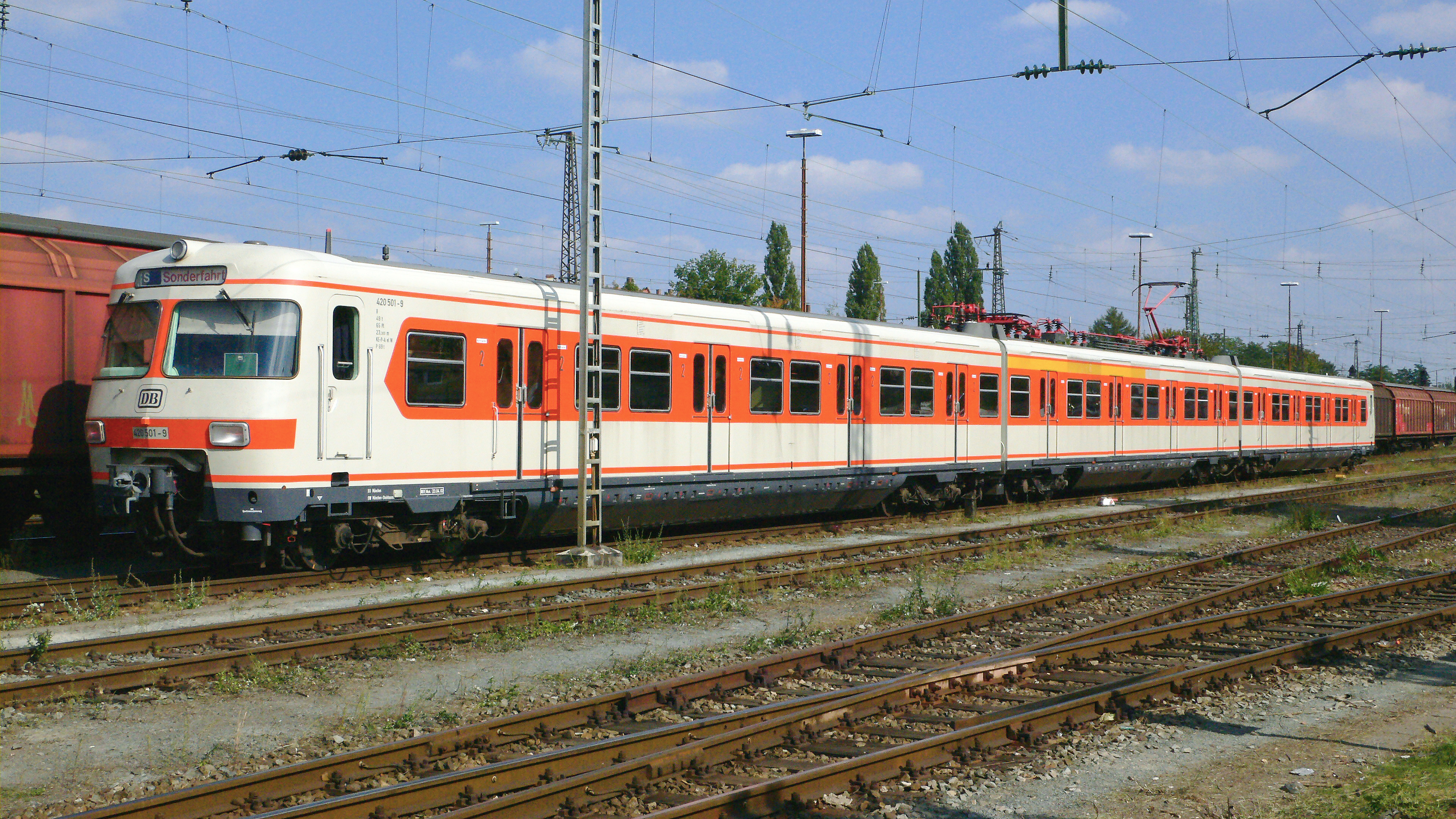
Prototype set 420 001 in orange and white livery

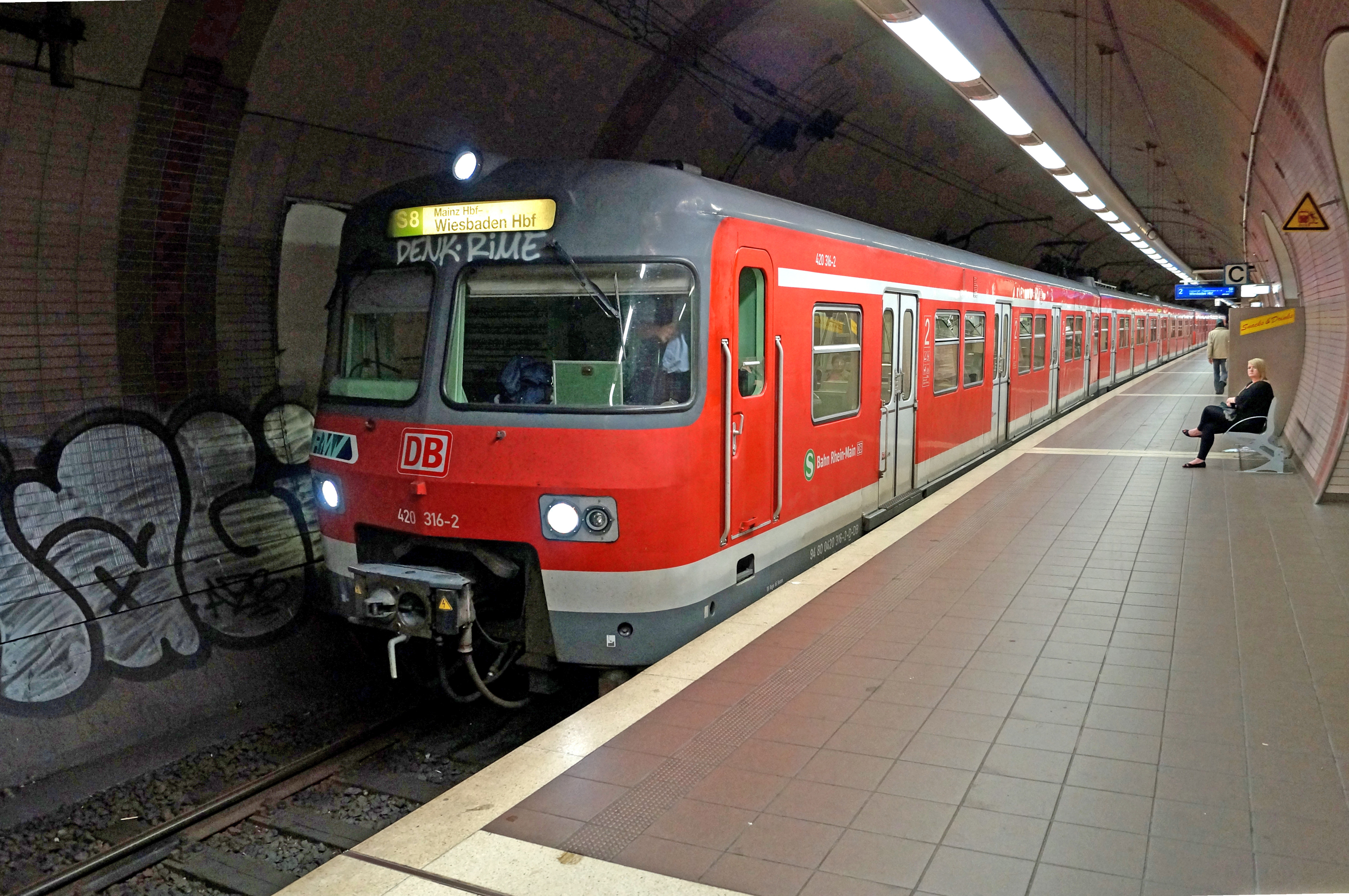
S-Bahn Rhein-Main 420 316 in the traffic red livery

=== Interior ===
Passenger accommodation consists of transverse seating bays in a 2+2 layout, with longitudinal folding seats at the luggage area in one of the end cars.

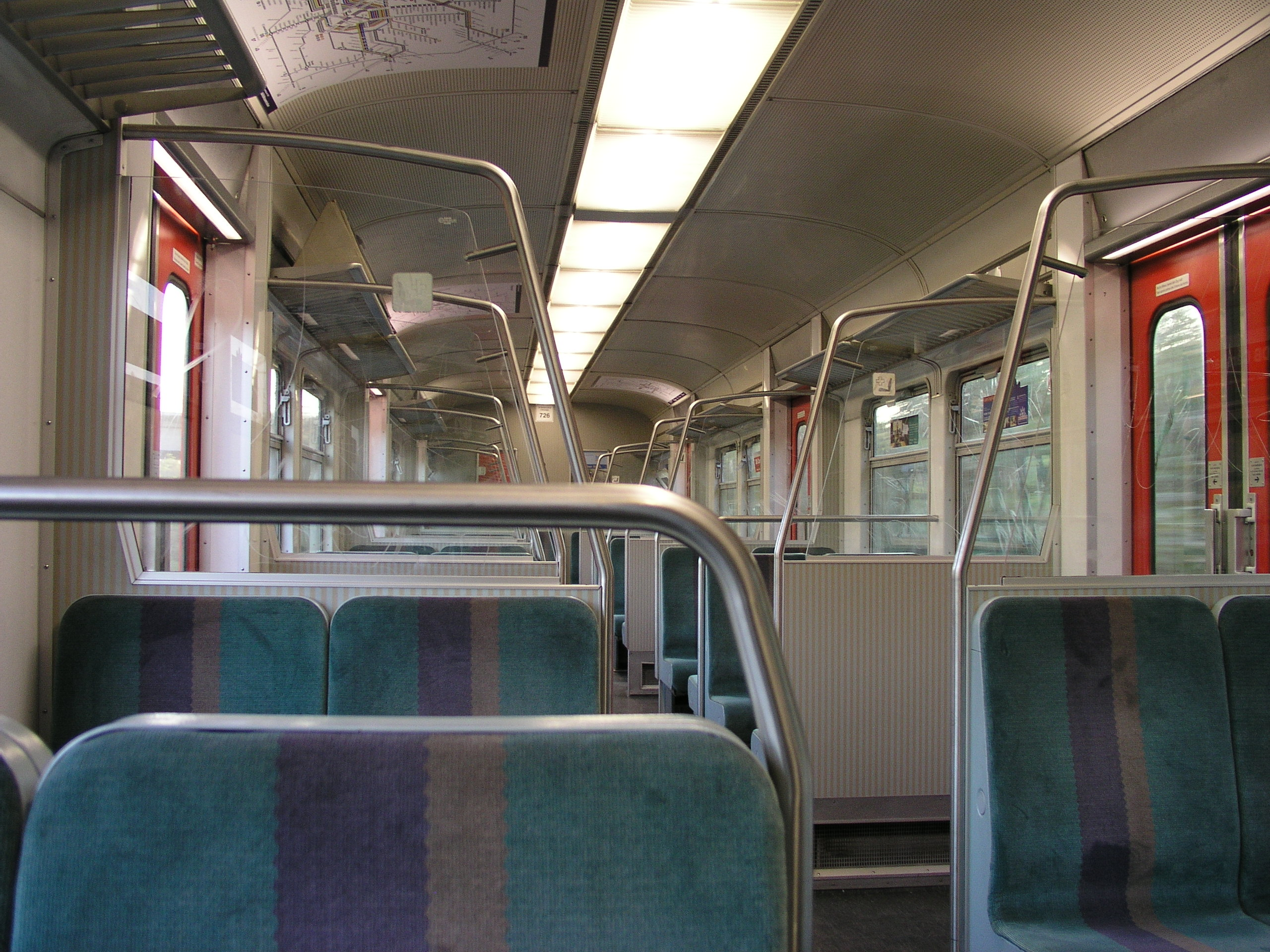
Interior of a S-Bahn Rhein-Main train

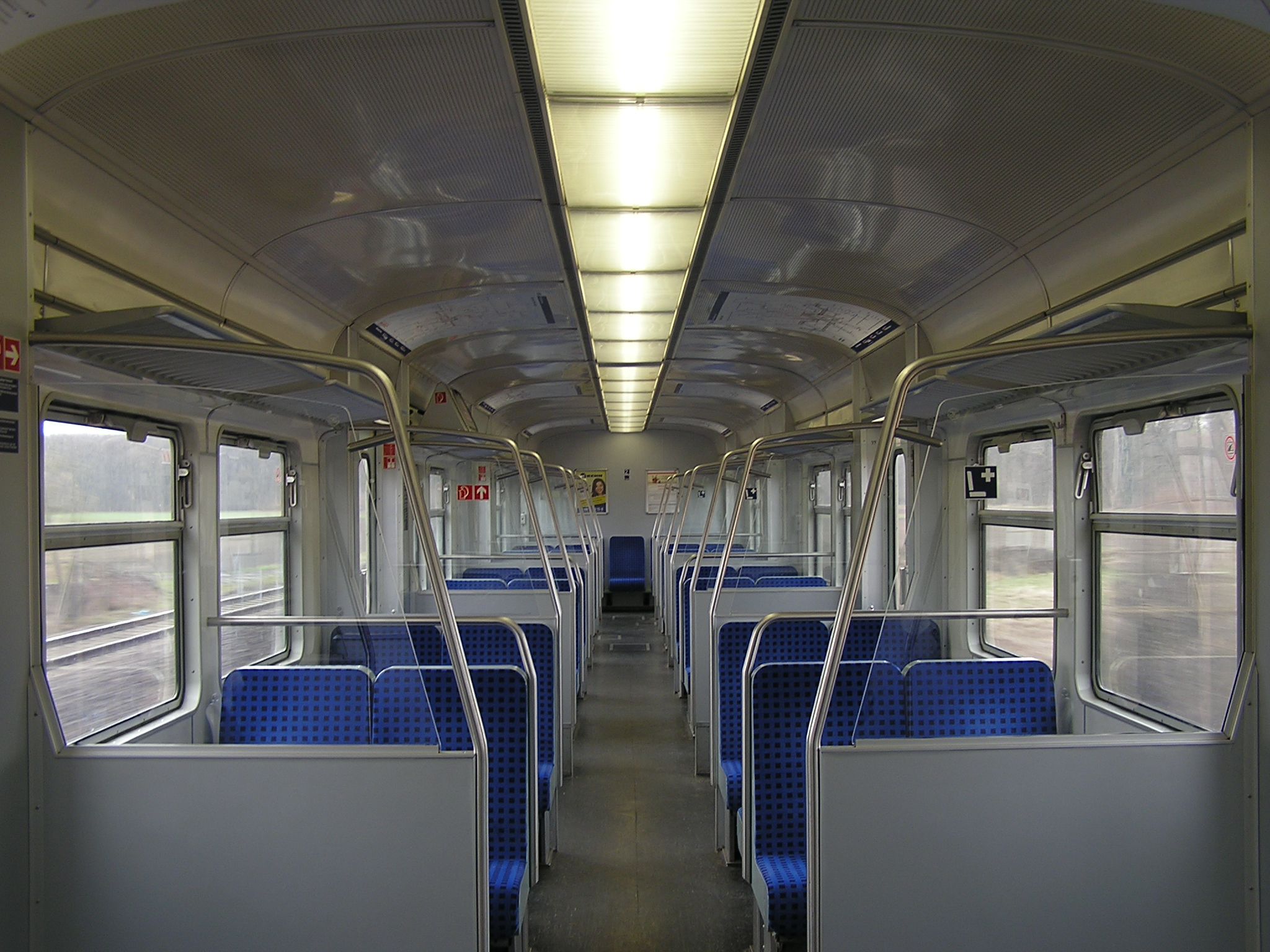
Interior of a refurbished train

=== 420Plus ===
Between April 2005 and January 2006, two trains (420 400 and 420 416) received an experimental refurbishment at DB Krefeld-Oppum works, and were branded as "420Plus". Changes to the interior included new seating, the addition of air conditioning and windows in the inner car ends, passenger information displays and push-button door openers. Entry into passenger service followed in April 2006.

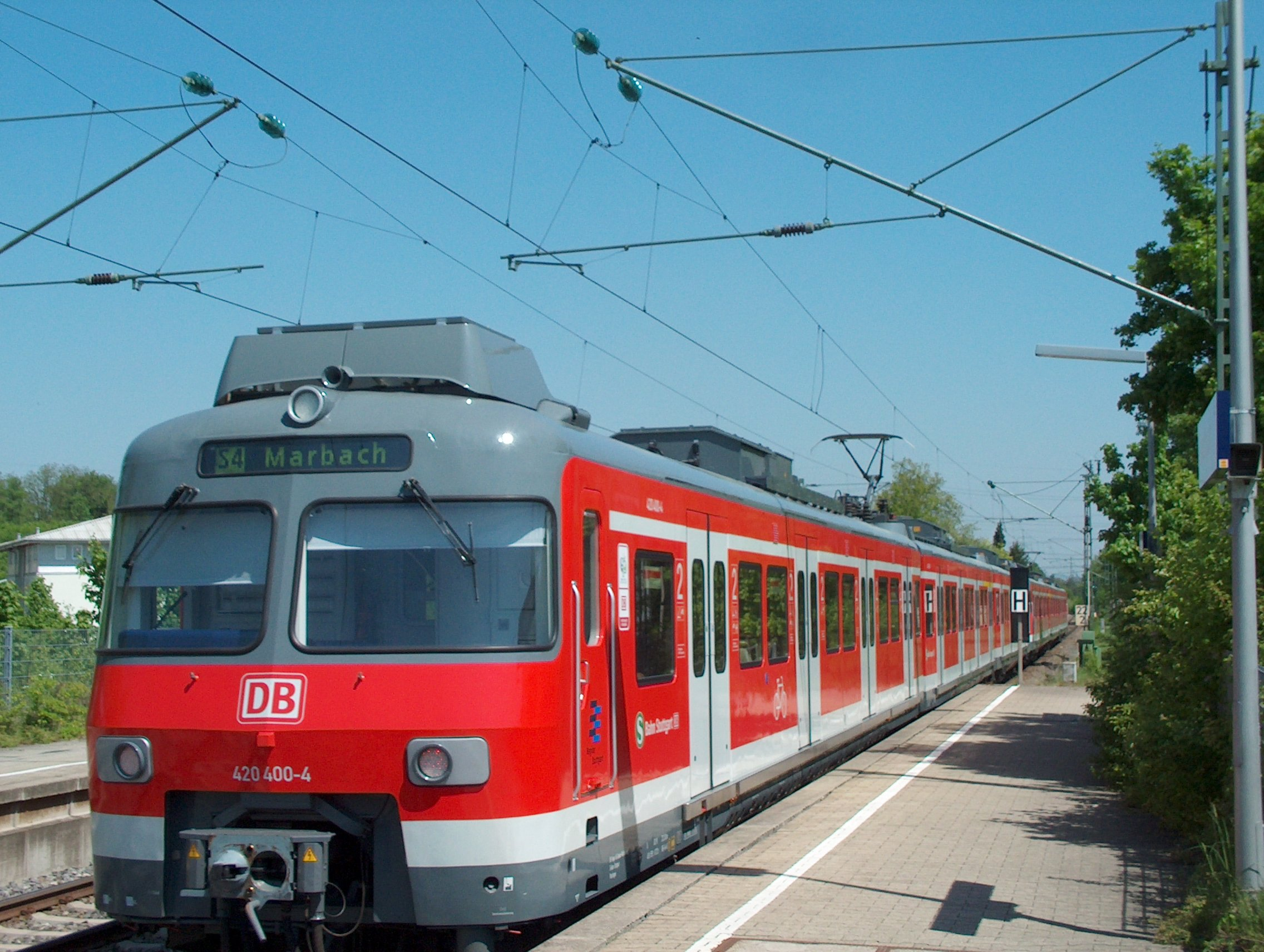
420 400 in May 2006

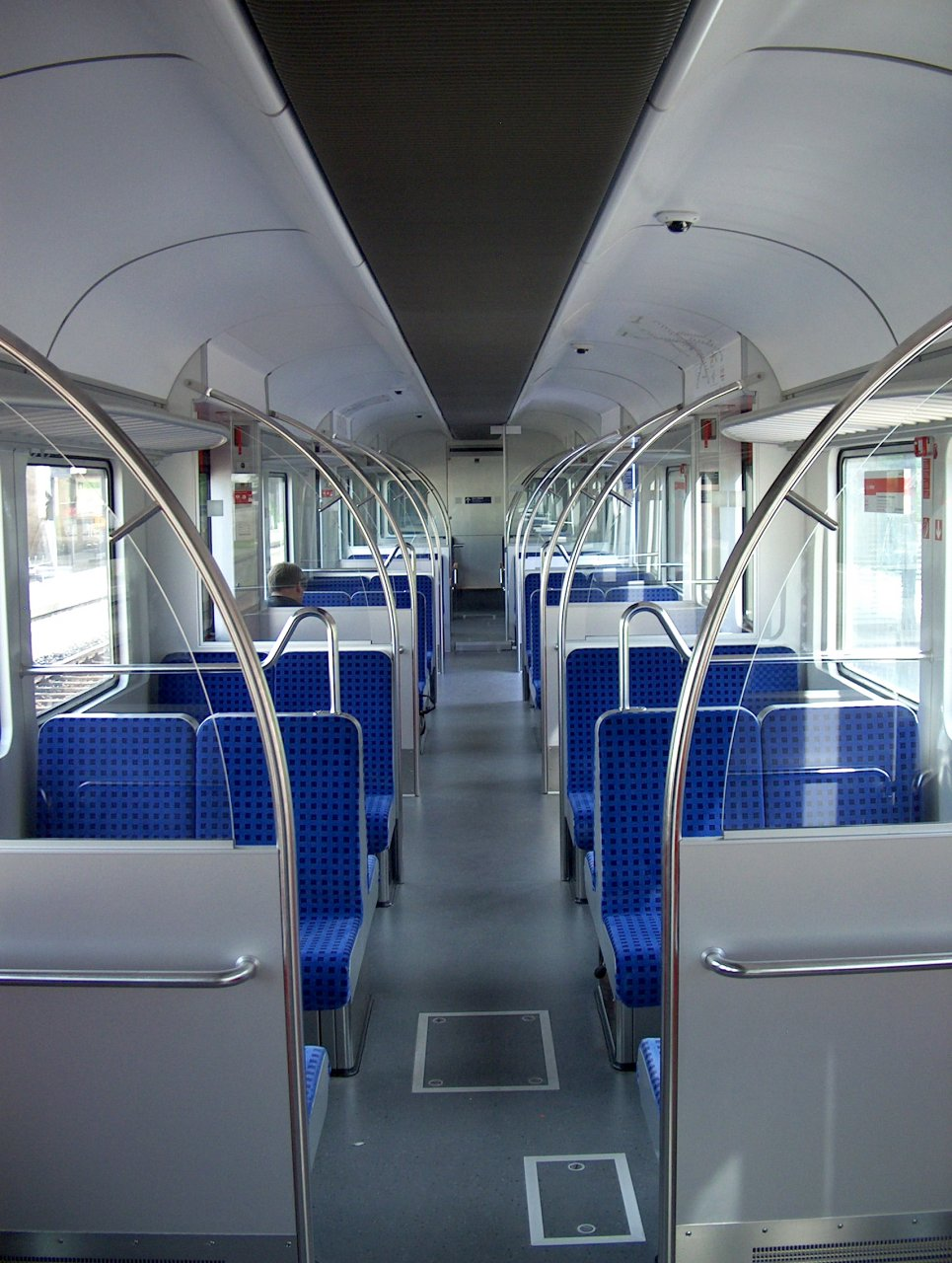
Interior of a 420Plus unit

== Technical specifications ==
=== Formation ===
Each unit consists of three cars. The end cars are designated as class 420, and the intermediate cars are designated as class 421. They are equipped with couplers enabling operation of up to three units together.

| | cab car | intermediate car | cab car |
|---|---|---|---|
| Numbering | 420 xxx | 421 xxx | 420 xxx +500 |

=== Car body ===
The car bodies of the end cars are made out of steel. The intermediate cars have aluminium car bodies. Beginning with the 2. batch units, the car body construction of the end cars was changed from steel to aluminium, in order to save weight.

=== Electric systems ===
The electrical equipment was built by AEG, Brown-Boveri, and Siemens. They are the first DB trains that were equipped with thyristor-phase control. Each bogie is fitted with two mixed current commutator motors. The current of the traction motors is controlled steplessly over two asymmetrical semi-controlled rectifier bridges in sequence.

== History ==
=== Munich ===
The first unit was presented in Munich on October 30, 1969. Entry into service on the Munich S-Bahn was in May 1972. The last original Munich S-Bahn units were withdrawn in December 2004.

15 refurbished former S-Bahn Stuttgart sets entered service on the Munich S-Bahn network in 2014. 21 further trains are scheduled to enter service in Munich, in order to reduce the shortage of rolling stock due to the refurbishment of Class 423 trains. These former Rhine-Ruhr S-Bahn units will be fitted with Linienzugbeeinflussung (LZB), which enables them to run on the Stammstrecke.

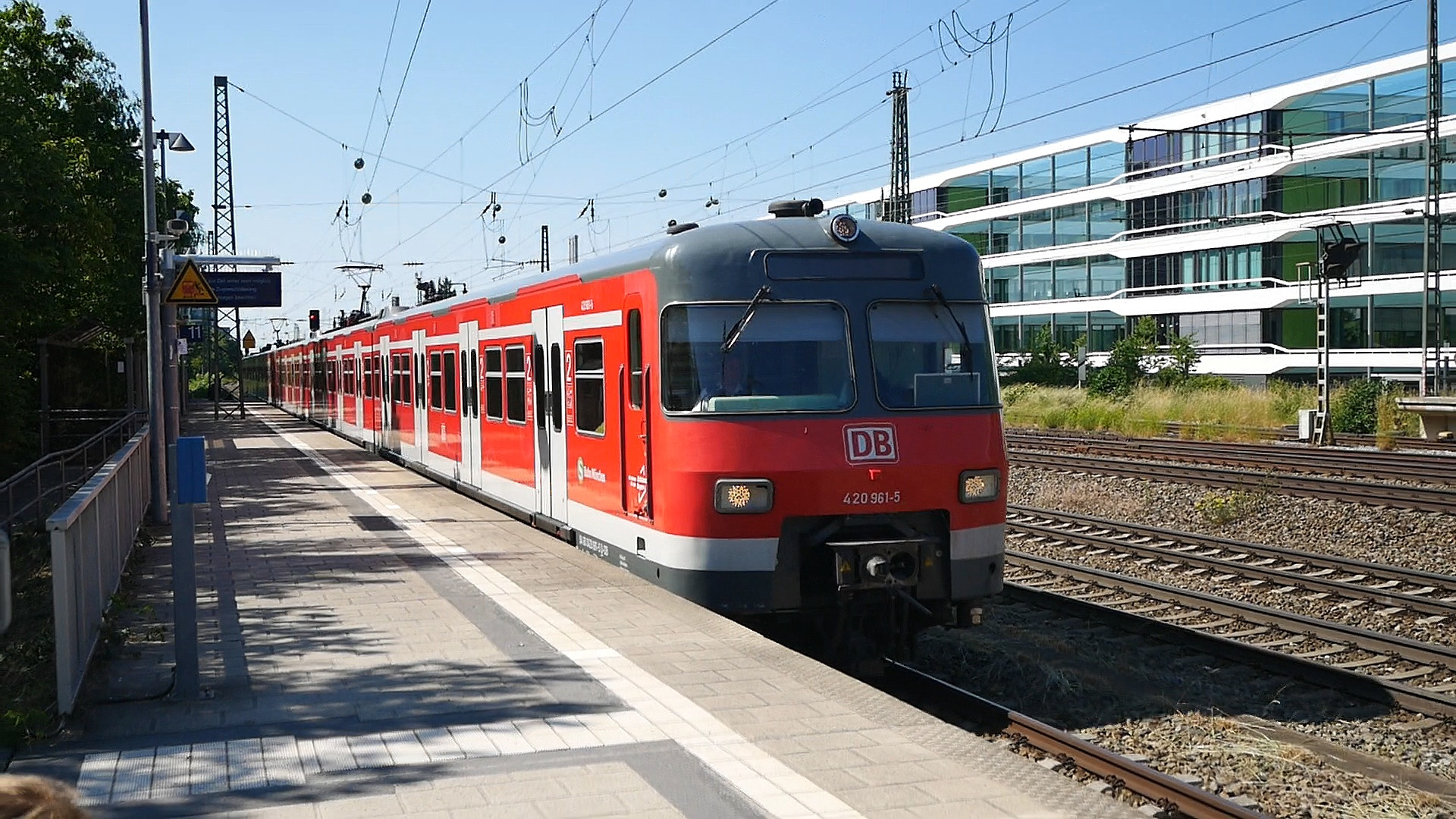
420 961 arrives at Munich Heimeranplatz in 2023

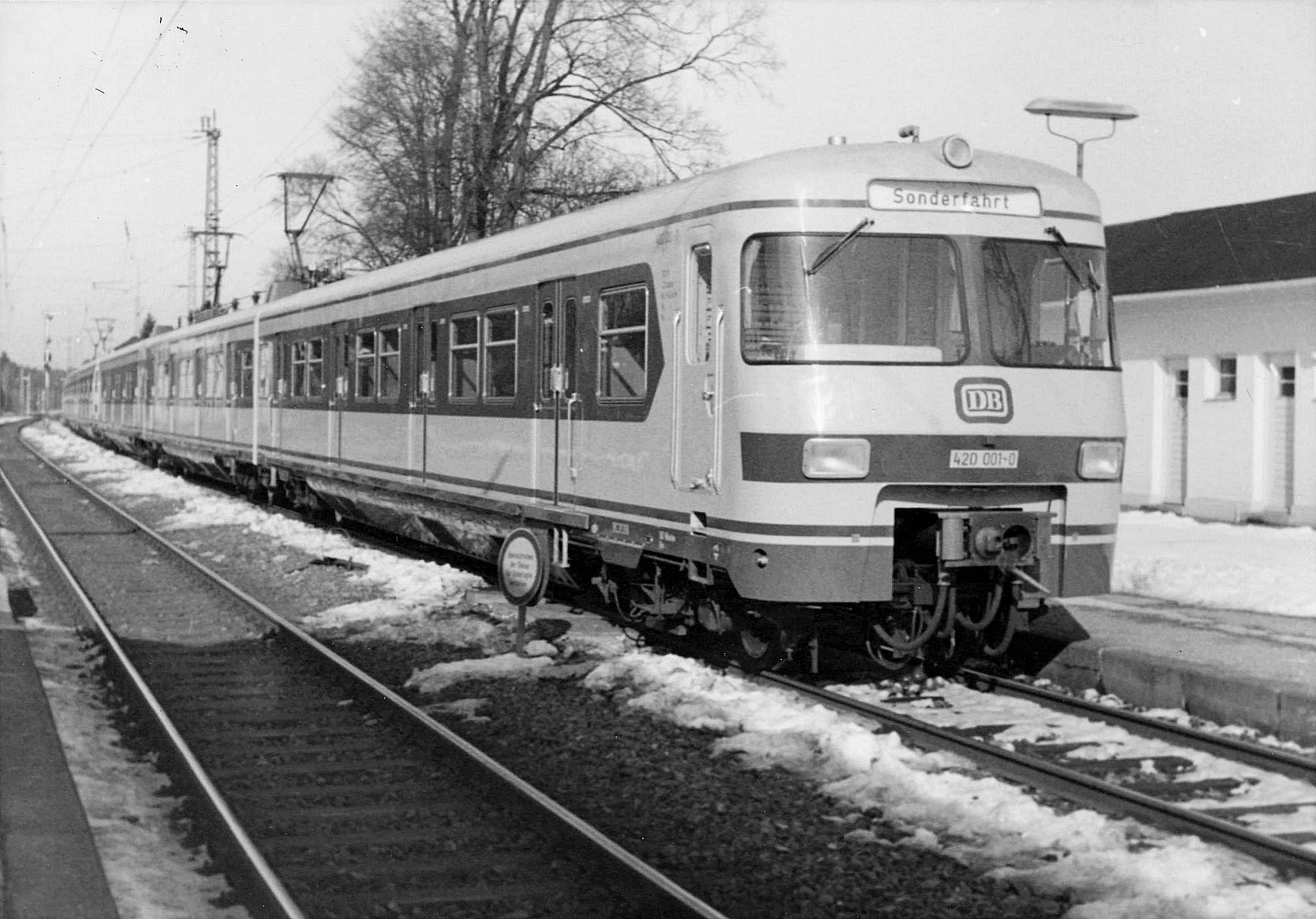
420 001 and another unidentified set at Gauting during trials, 1970

=== Stuttgart ===
The trains entered service on the Stuttgart S-Bahn network in 1978.

The last trains (420 450 and 420 461) were withdrawn from Stuttgart S-Bahn services after an official farewell run from Plochingen to Stuttgart Hauptbahnhof on November 4, 2016, followed by five scheduled public farewell runs on the same day.

=== Frankfurt and Rhine-Main area ===
The trains entered service in the Rhine-Main area in April 1978.

The last trains were withdrawn from Frankfurt/Rhein-Main S-Bahn services in November 2014.

=== Cologne and Rhine-Ruhr area ===
Class 420 trains entered service in the Rhine-Ruhr area in May 1974. The trains had smoking and non-smoking cars.

=== Stockholm ===
In 2003, 15 sets were lent to Storstockholms Lokaltrafik for use on commuter rail services around Stockholm. These SL Class X420 trains underwent modifications, which included changes to the cabs, the addition of Swedish Automatic Train Control, and boards to cope with the lower platform heights in Stockholm. The trains were scrapped after their withdrawal.

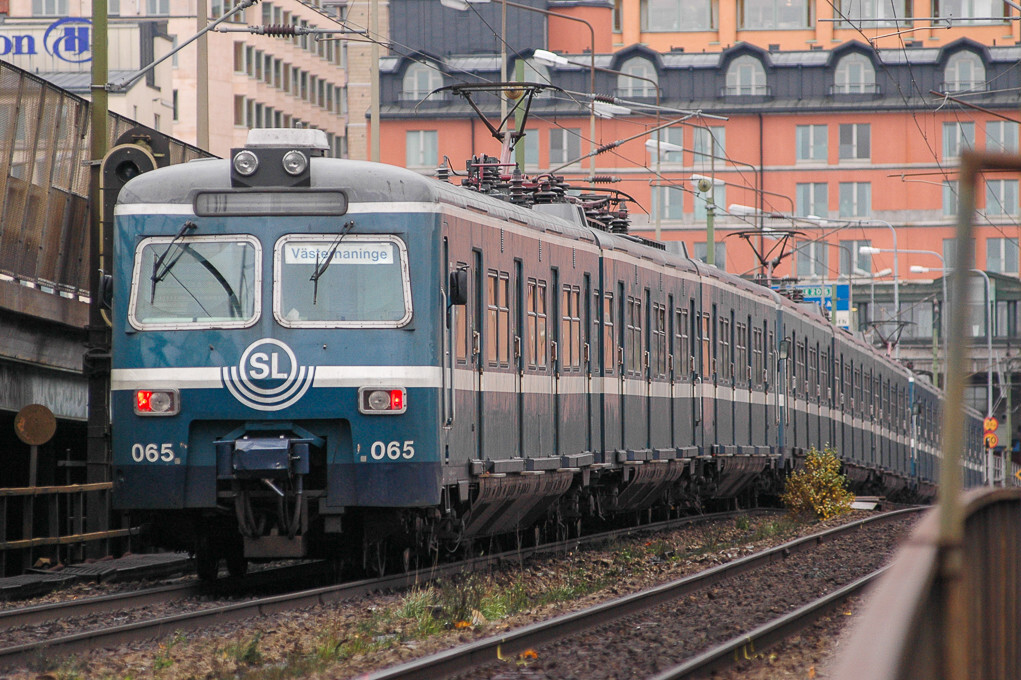
A X420 train in Stockholm in October 2004

== Preserved examples ==
Five units and one end car are preserved in various museums.

- 420 001: Prototype set, preserved at the DB Museum in Nuremberg
- 420 002: Prototype end car 420 002, preserved at the Deutsches Museum Verkehrszentrum in Munich
- 420 298: Former S-Bahn Stuttgart / S-Bahn Rhein-Main unit, preserved by Oberhessische Eisenbahnfreunde in Gießen
- 420 300: First unit for the Stuttgart S-Bahn network, preserved at the Eisenbahn-Erlebniswelt in Horb am Neckar
- 420 400: Refurbished 420Plus unit, preserved at the Eisenbahn-Erlebniswelt in Horb am Neckar
- 420 416: Refurbished 420Plus unit, preserved at the DB Museum in Nuremberg

Additionally, one cab end is preserved as a driving simulator.

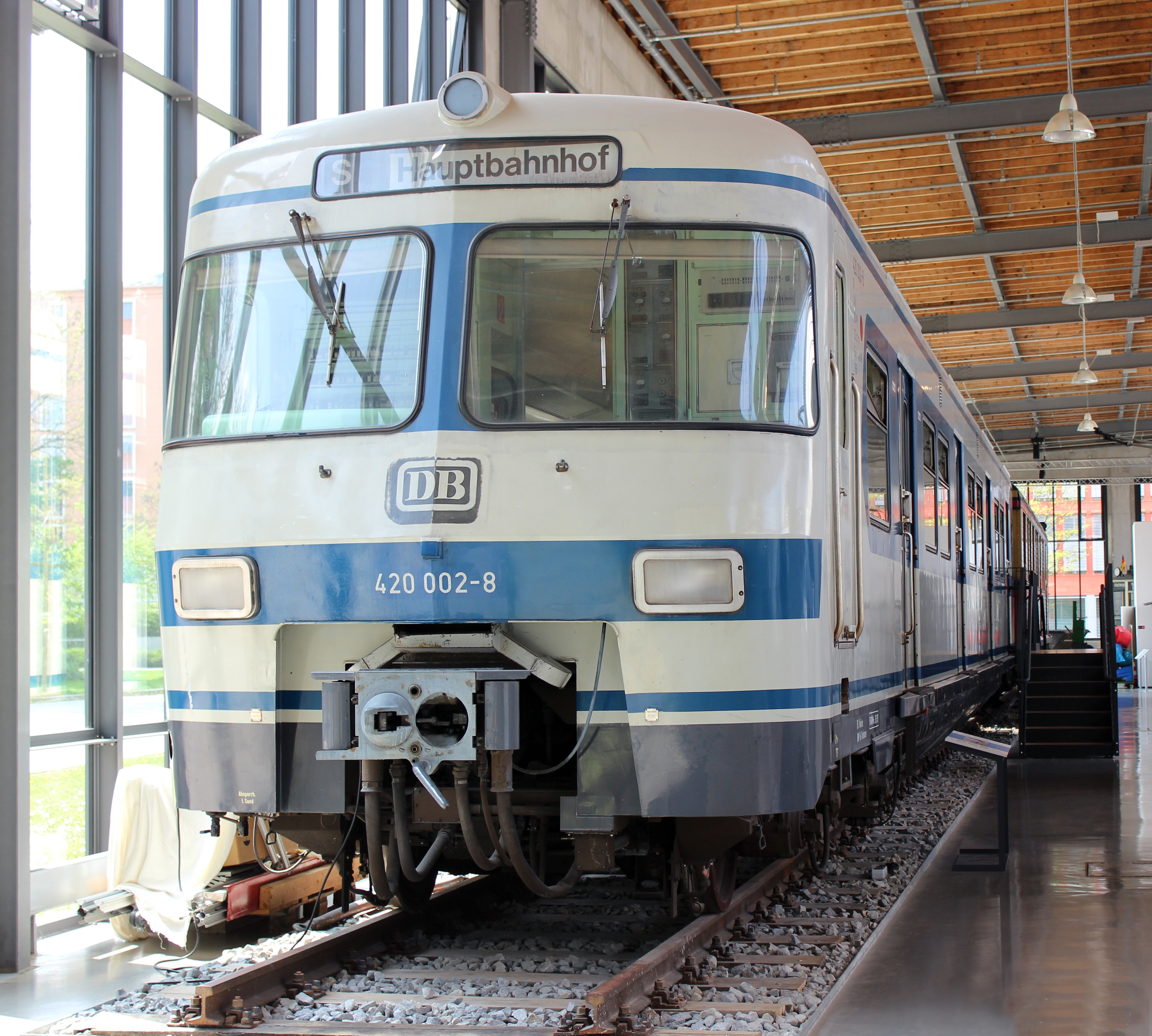
End car 420 002 at the Deutsches Museum Verkehrszentrum in Munich

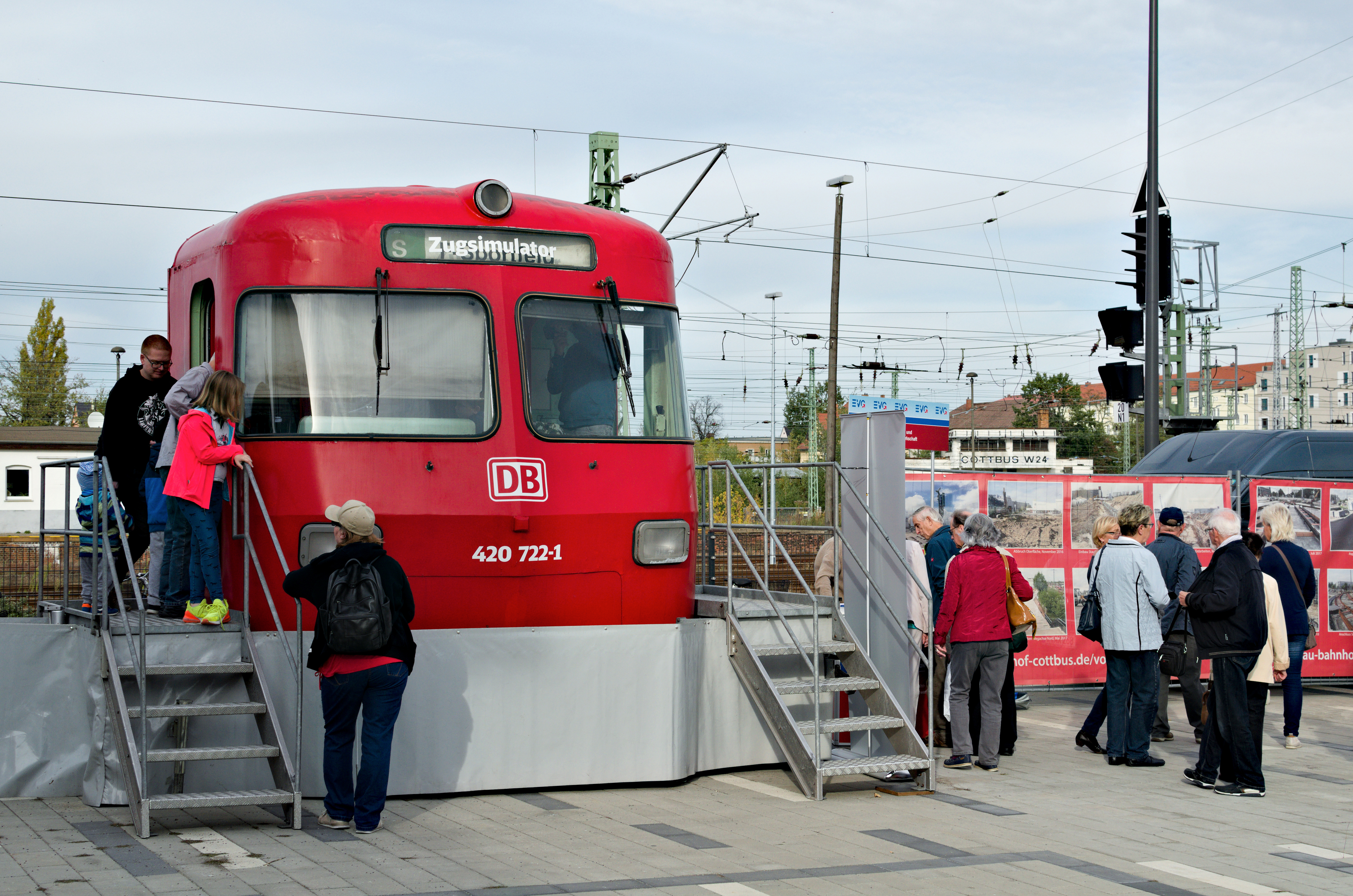
Cab end with driving simulator

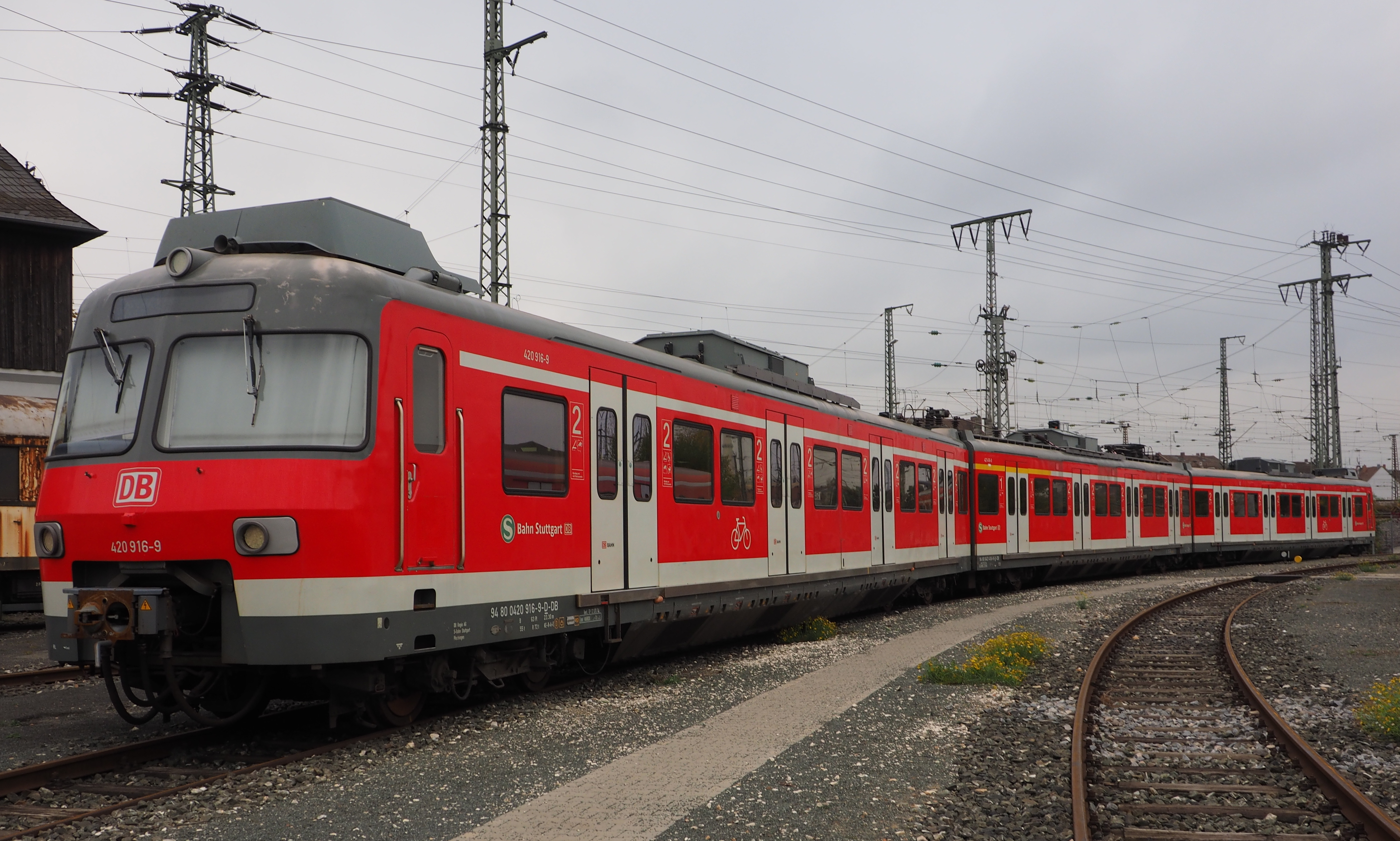
420Plus at the DB Museum in Nuremberg
