= EN 15227 =

European railway crashworthiness standard

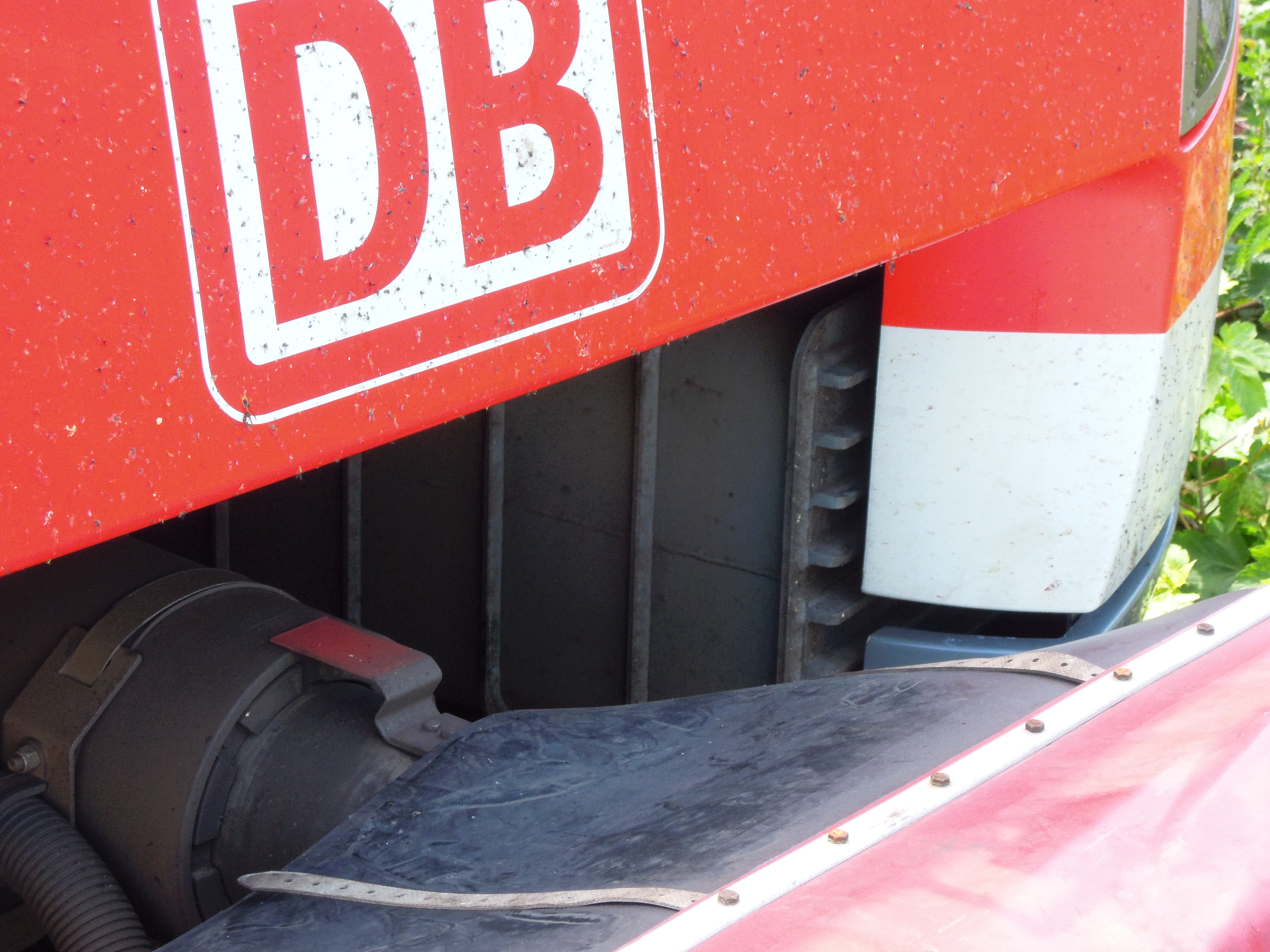
Anti-climbing protection on DBAG Class 422 with horizontal ribs and the crash box behind them, all covered by the outer hull of the cabin compartement

EN 15227 (Railway applications - Crashworthiness requirements for rail vehicles) is a European standard about the crashworthiness requirements for railway vehicle bodies. It was first resolved in 2008 and it is binding since 2012 for all new vehicles in the European Union.

The required energy absorption modules had major impacts on the headshape design of locomotives and passenger rolling stock. The specification is accompanied by EN 12663 (Structural requirements of railway vehicle bodies) that was updated in 2008 to meet the EN 15227 scenarios.

== Scenarios ==
The main definitions of EN 15227 look at a number of crash scenarios:

- head-on collision of similar vehicles at a speed of 36 km/h (22 mph)
- collision with a freight wagon of 80 metric tons (79 long tons; 88 short tons) at a speed of 36 km/h (22 mph)
- collision with a lorry at a grade crossing at a speed of 110 km/h (68 mph)
- collision with a smaller object like a car at a grade crossing.

For each scenario and train class there are minimum requirements on the remaining space in the driver cabin after the crash. Due to the expensive equipment there are no full body crash tests in railway applications. Instead the impact is simulated with finite element analysis and parts of the structure are validated by a real crash test (simulation and test result may not differ more than ten percent).

== Result ==
Before the time of EN 15227 the head of a locomotive was simply part of the full body of the railway vehicle. This has been replaced by a separately designed cabin that is subsequently integrated with the rest of the vehicle body. The area around the couplers is very different with the required anti-climbing protection buffers and the energy-absorption elements behind them. The rest of the headshape may come in very different designs as they are commonly made from fiberglass or carbon fiber.

=== Gallery ===
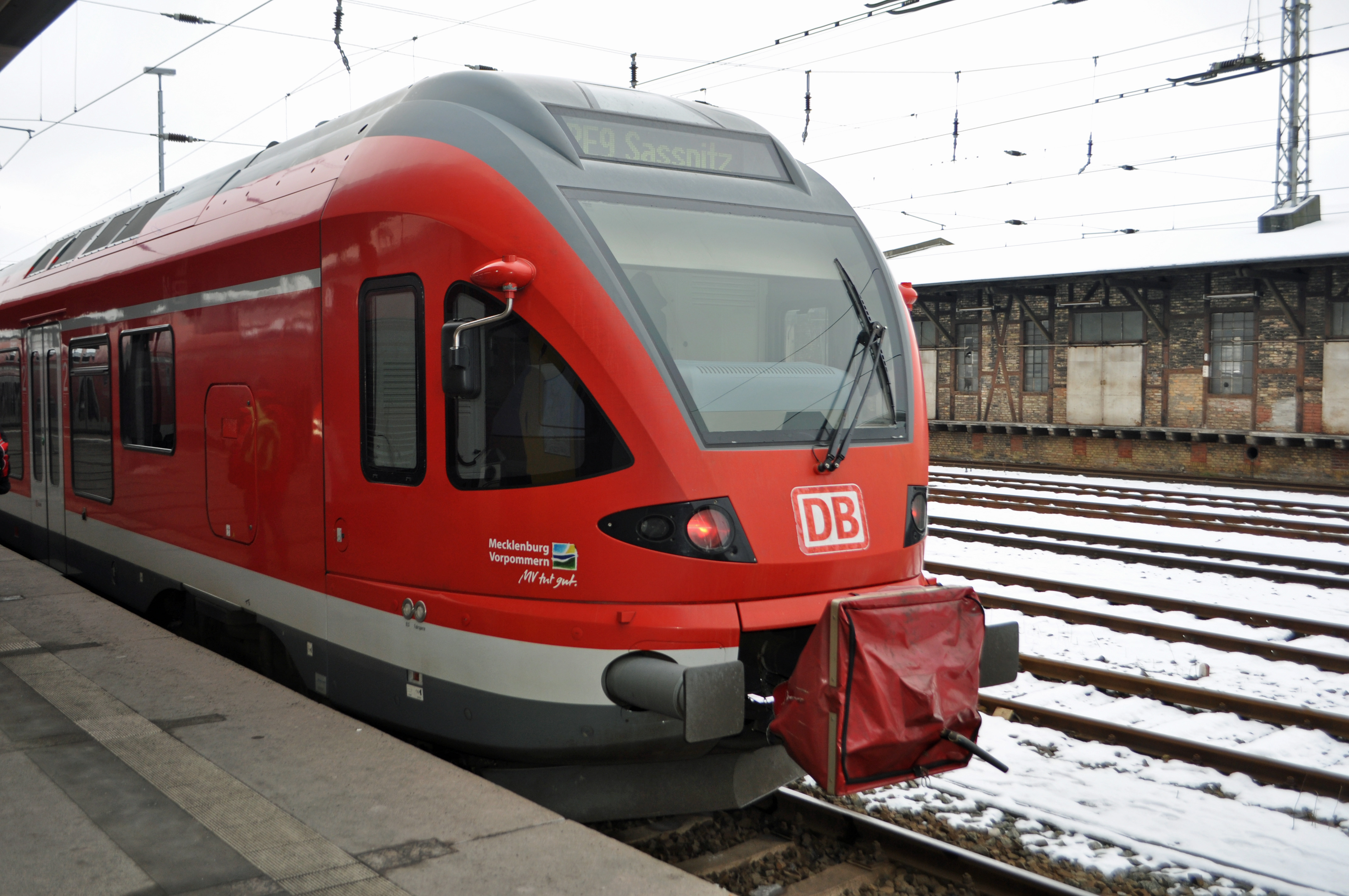
Stadler Flirt traditional design

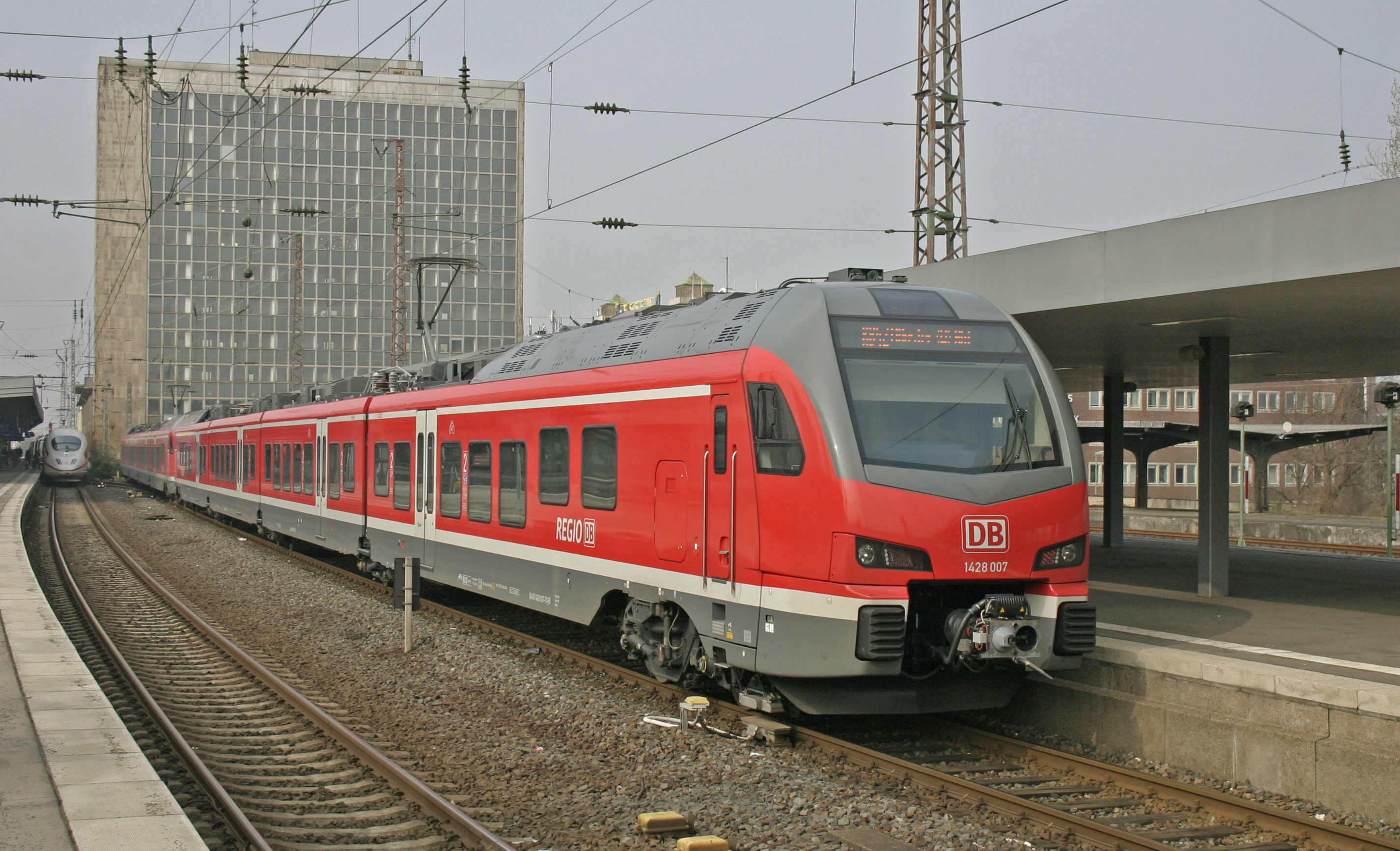
… Stadler Flirt 3 with a crash-optimized headshape
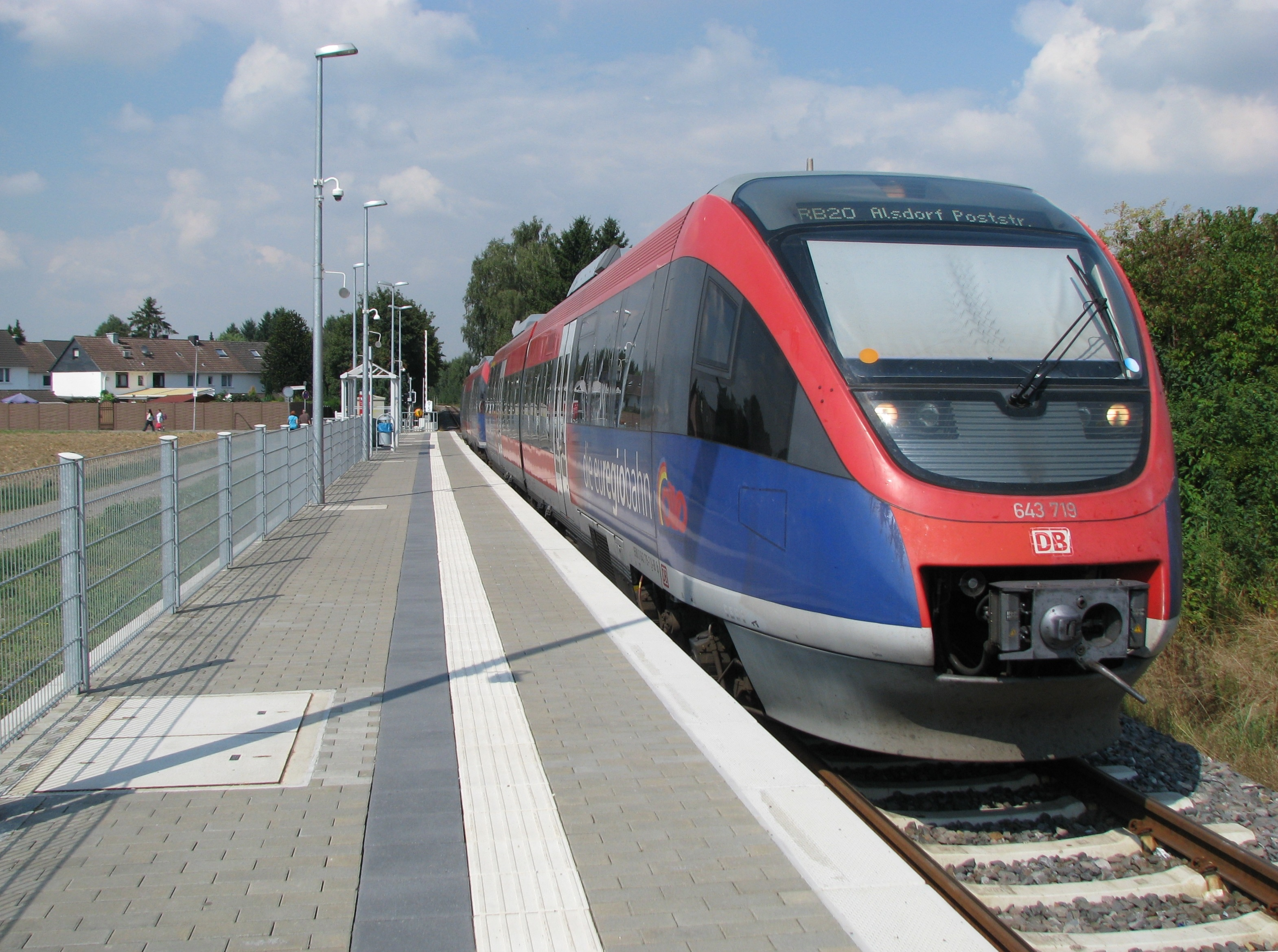
Bombardier Talent traditional design

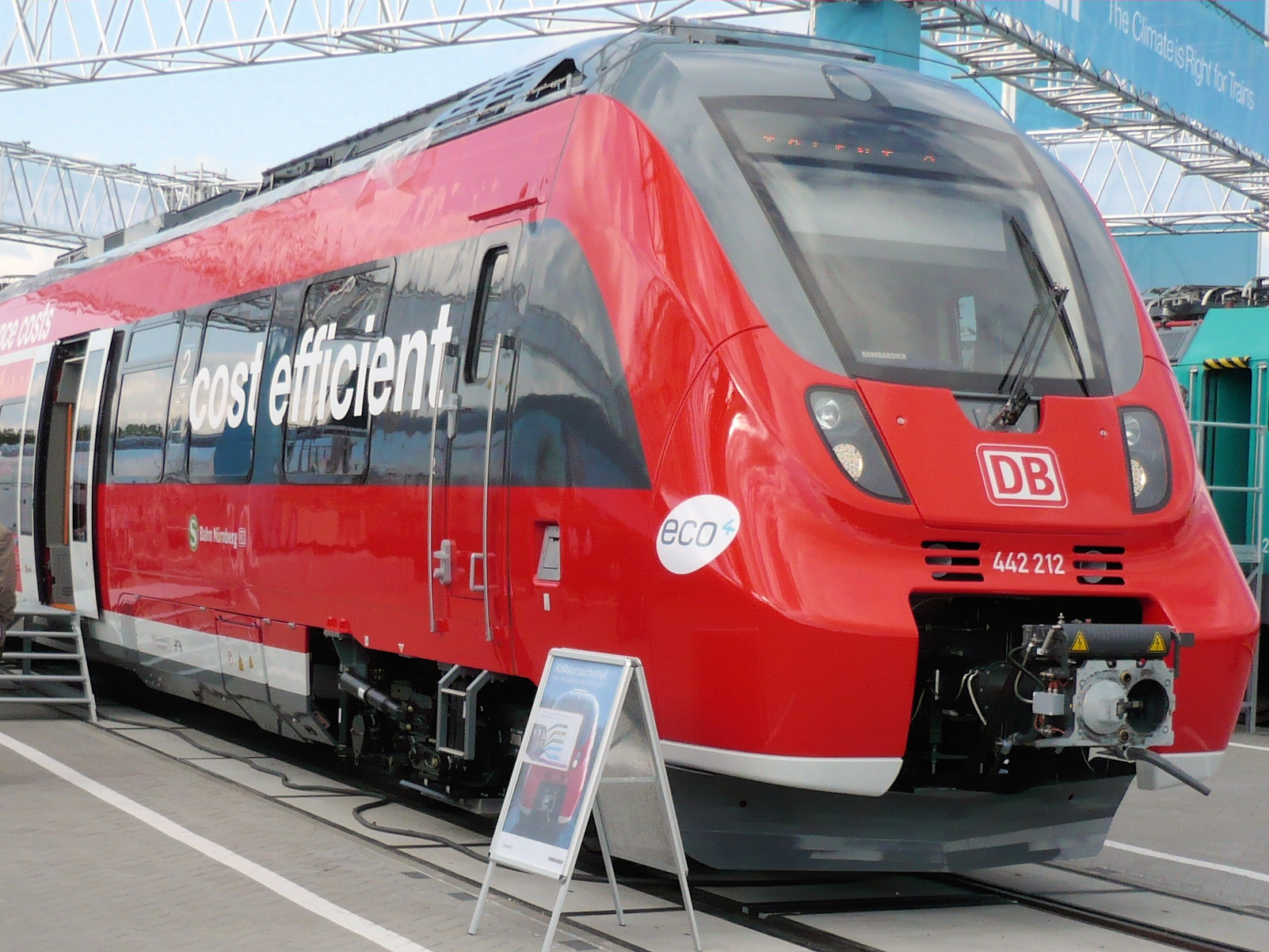
… Bombardier Talent 2 with a crash-optimized headshape
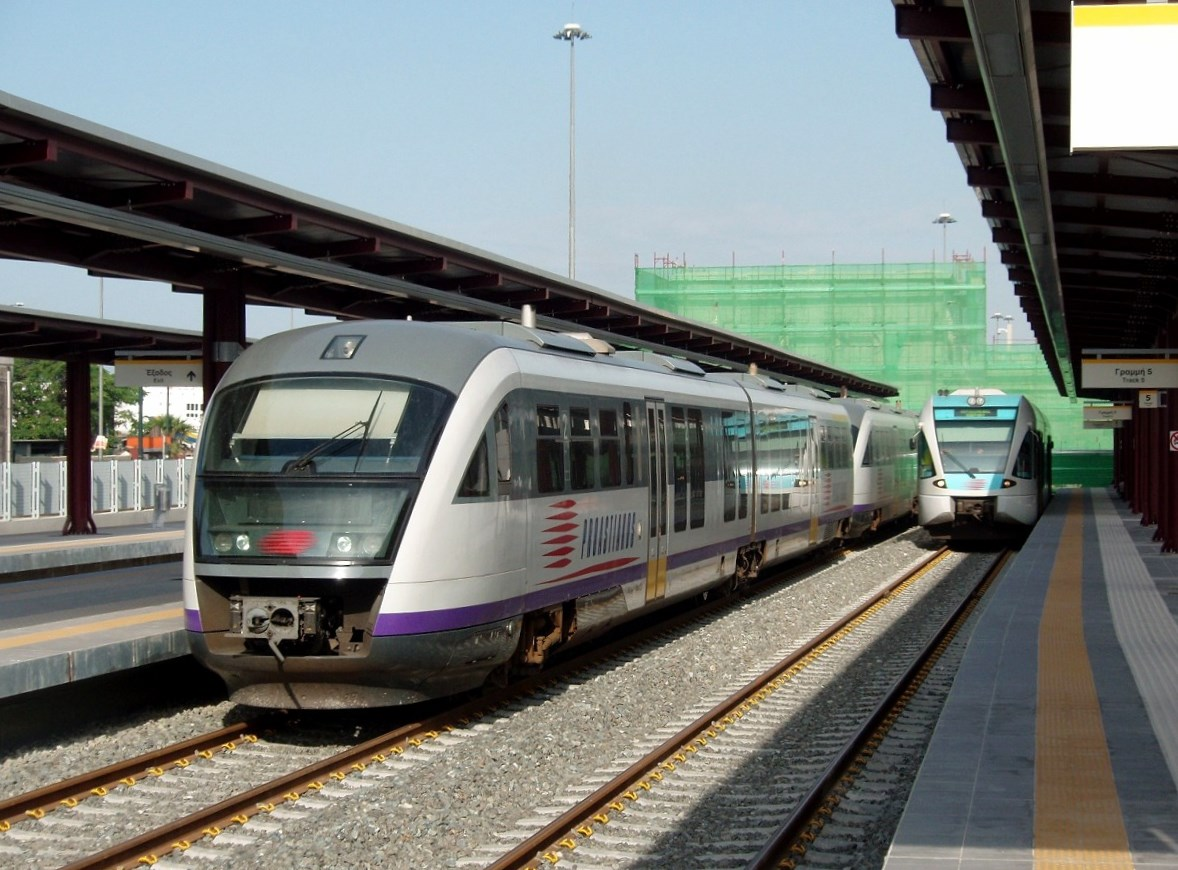
Siemens Desiro Classic traditional design

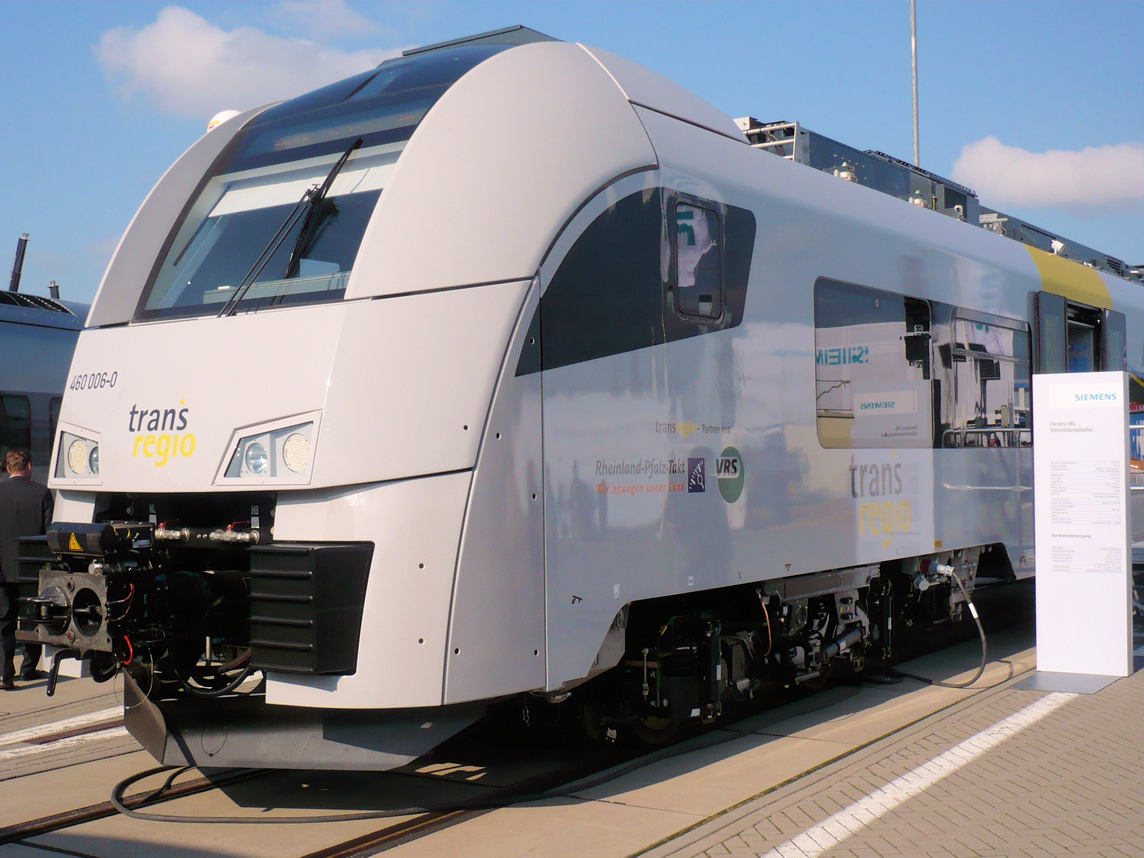
… Siemens Desiro ML with a crash-optimized headshape
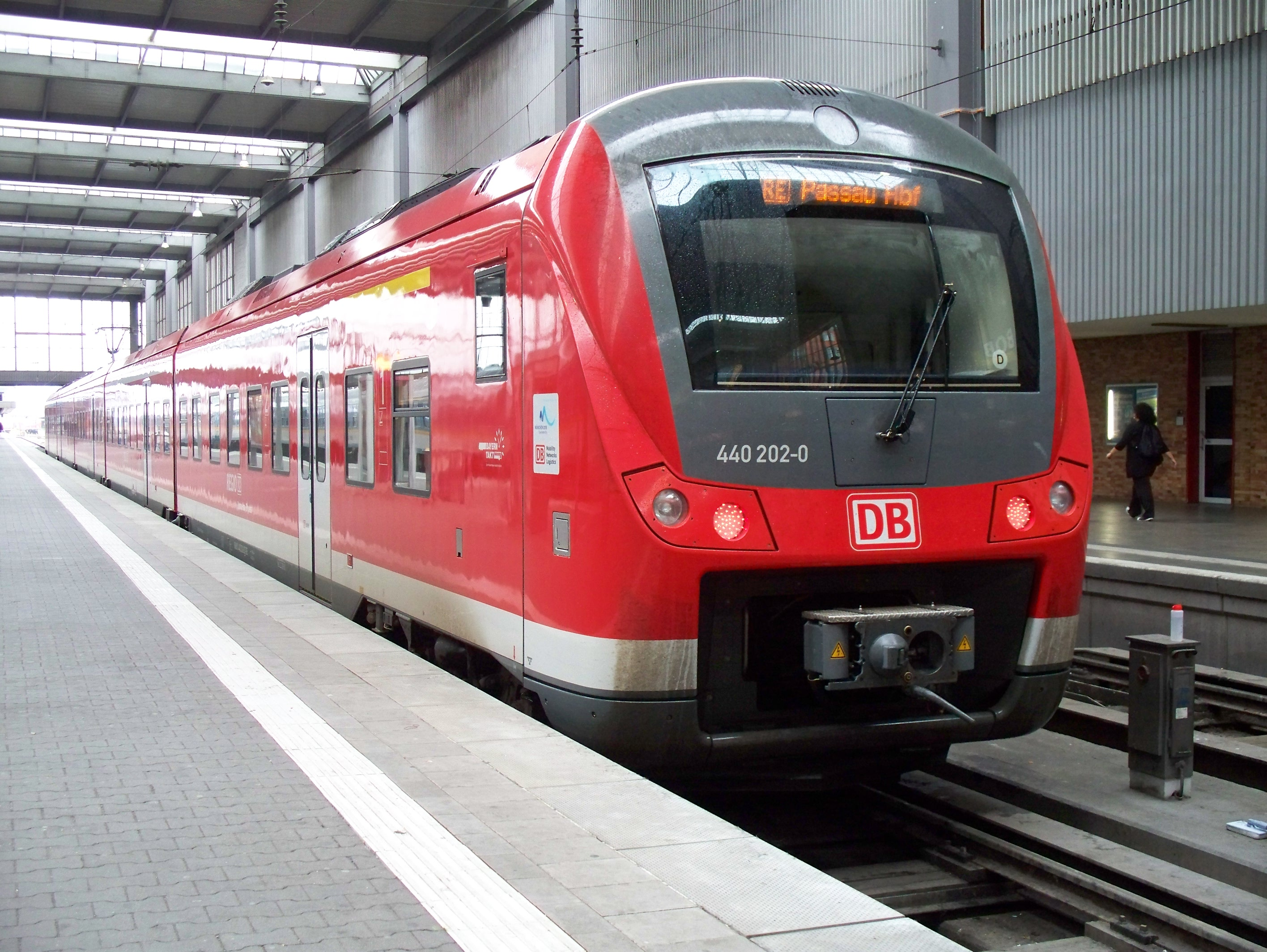
Alstom Coradia Continental, series 440 in traditional design

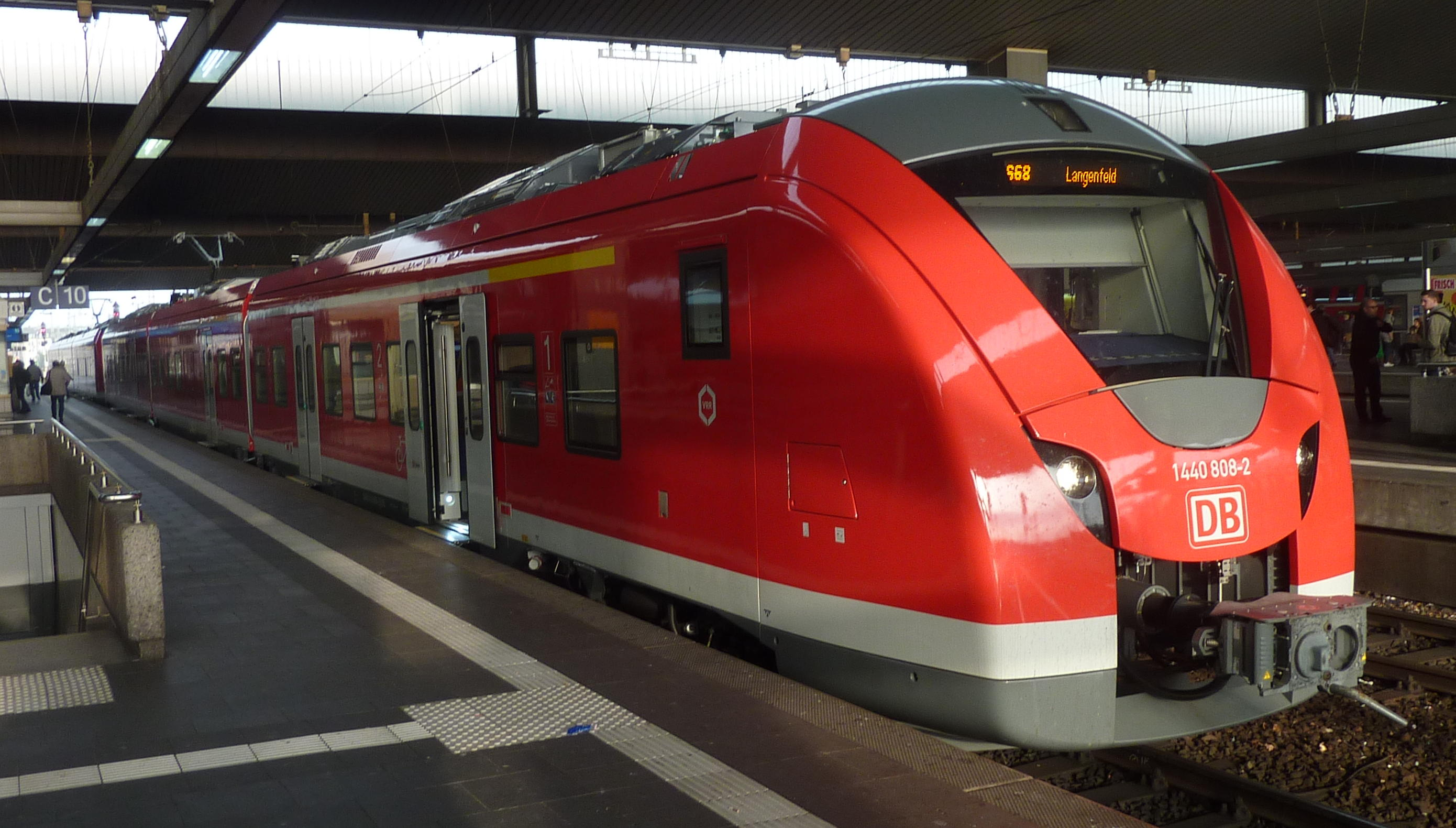
and newer series 1440 with a crash-optimized headshape

== Regulations ==
EN 15227 was made mandatory in 2008 by the Technical Specifications for Interoperability (TSI) decisions - the 2008/232/CE for high-speed railway and 2008/57/EC for conventional rail. While ongoing projects were allowed to be completed, all new procurements since then must include the requirement.

The comparable standards in the United States are 49CFR238 from the FRA and S-C&S-034-99 from the APTA. In an initial assessment the European standard was considered to be not equivalent and compliance with one standard would not imply compliance with the other standard. However, the required "Crash Energy Management System" of US origin can be integrated into the EN 15227 cabin resulting in a vehicle that can be shown to be compliant in both areas.

== See also ==
- Crashworthiness
- Telescoping (rail cars)
