= DBAG Class 422 =

German electric multiple unit train type

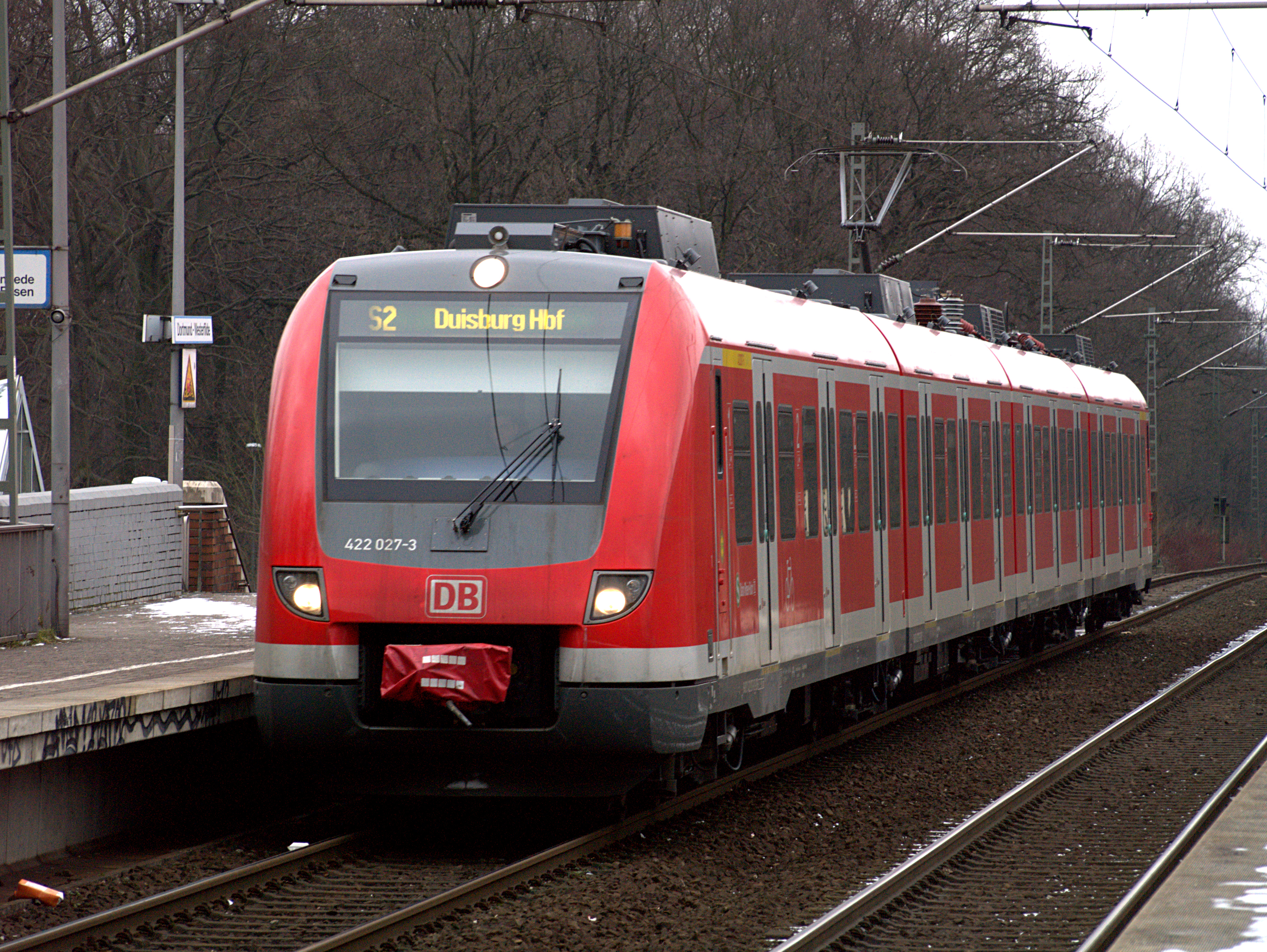
- 422 027 at Dortmund-Westerfilde station
- Manufacturers: Alstom, Bombardier
- Constructed: 2007 – 2011
- Entered service: 2008
- Number built: 84
- Predecessor: Class 423
- Successor: Class 430
- Operator: DB Regio
- Line served: S-Bahn Rhein-Ruhr

Specifications
- Car length: 69.43 metres (227 ft 9 7/16 in)
- Width: 3,020 millimetres (9 ft 10 7/8 in)
- Height: 4,033 millimetres (13 ft 2 3/4 in)
- Floor height: 1,025 millimetres (40.4 in)
- Platform height: 960 mm
- Doors: 12
- Maximum speed: 140 km/h
- Weight: 112t
- Power output: 2,350 kW
- Power supply: Electric
- Electric system: 15 kV 16.7 Hz
- UIC classification: Bo'(Bo')(2')(Bo')Bo'
- Braking systems: Electric, air
- Safety systems: Sifa, PZB
- Track gauge: 1,435 mm (4 ft 8 1/2 in)

The Class 422 is a series of four-car electric multiple units that are a derivative of the DBAG Class 423. The two inner cars in the set are designated as Class 432 vehicles.

== History ==
The units were commissioned by Deutsche Bahn in 2005. 78 units worth €343 million were built by Bombardier Transportation and Alstom and delivered between March 2008 and October 2010. They are now used in such places as like on the Rhine-Ruhr S-Bahn which operate in cities like Köln and Düsseldorf as well as the Ruhr area.

Deutsche Bahn uses the units on the Rhine-Ruhr S-Bahn network, unlike most S-Bahn Networks which use similar DBAG Class 423 trains. The inner carriages are called Class 432. Following a timetable change in December of 2019 the units are currently used exclusively on the S1, S4, S5 and S6 lines of the network.
