= Ramersdorf-Perlach =

Borough of Munich, Germany

Coordinates: 48.1028°N 11.6250°E

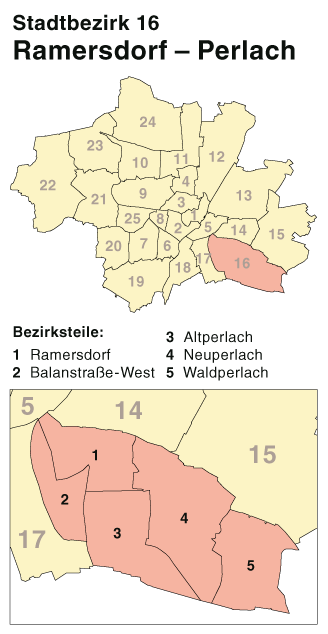
District map

Ramersdorf-Perlach (German pronunciation: [ˈʁaːmɐsdɔʁf ˈpɛʁlax]) is a borough of Munich. It is located south-east of the city center and is the most populous of Munich's boroughs with a population of about 116,000. It consists of the five districts Ramersdorf, Balanstraße West, Altperlach, Neuperlach and Waldperlach.

== Overview ==
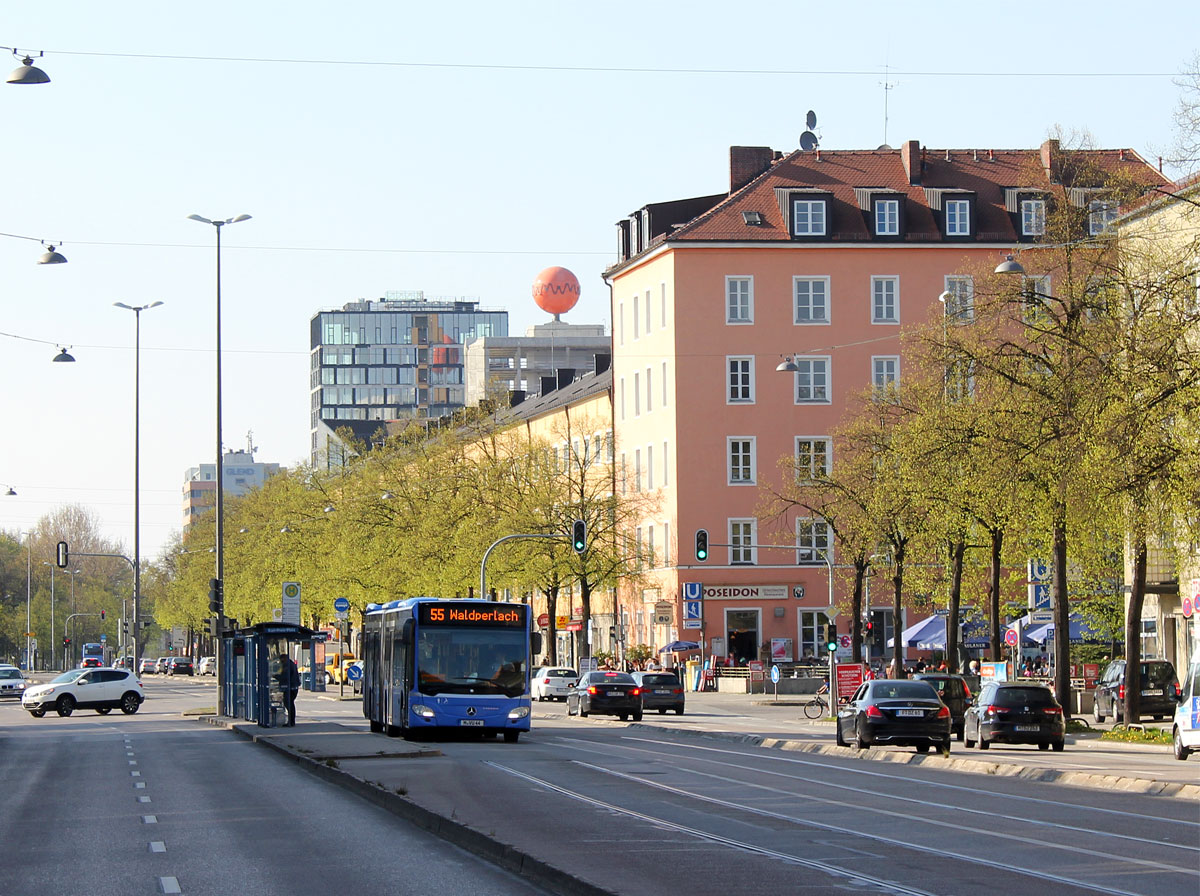
Karl-Preis-Platz in Ramersdorf

Ramersdorf-Perlach consists of the two former municipalities Ramersdorf (incorporated on 1 January 1864) and Perlach (incorporated on 1 January 1930) as well as the two districts Waldperlach and Neuperlach located in the former municipal area of Perlach. The former Perlach districts of Michaeliburg and Fasangarten now largely belong to the boroughs of Trudering-Riem and Obergiesing-Fasangarten, respectively.

The district has eleven primary schools, nine secondary schools (three Mittelschulen, four Realschulen, two Gymnasiums), two special schools, one orientation school, two vocational schools, nine Kinderkrippen (children under three), 43 Kindergärten (nursery schools), 21 afternoon childcare facilities, eight recreational homes, 72 parks or green spaces (151 hectares), 44 playgrounds, four district sports facilities, two district libraries, one indoor and one outdoor swimming pool. As part of the urban area orientation of the Münchner Volkshochschule, a branch of the Munich Adult Education Centre was set up in Neuperlach-Süd. On the district's border with Giesing, the University of Television and Film Munich was located until 2011. There are 75 stops of the Münchner Verkehrsgesellschaft (including five stops of the Munich U-Bahn and two of the Munich S-Bahn within the district, as well as three underground and two S-Bahn stations on the district borders, plus eleven bus or tram lines). The district committee consists of 45 members.

=== Architecture ===
Ramersdorf-Perlach is home to one of Munich's oldest churches, the St. Mary's Church in Ramersdorf which was mentioned for the first time in 1315. Two further old churches in the settlement of Perlach are the St. Michael's church and the St. Paul's church which is the oldest Protestant church in Munich.

=== Economy ===
Several large companies such as for example Allianz, Siemens AG, Wacker Chemie or BSH Home Appliances have headquarters or operate development centers in the district of Neuperlach. The editorial office of the teenage magazine Bravo is also based in Neuperlach, as well as one of Munich's largest shopping malls, the pep.

=== Recreation ===
The public park Ostpark, Munich's largest waterpark Michaelibad and the cemetery Neuer Südfriedhof are located in Ramersdorf-Perlach. The small river Hachinger Bach enters Munich in Perlach.

=== Culture ===
The museum of the Munich public transport company MVG ist located at Ständlerstraße in the Balanstraße West district.

== Ramersdorf ==
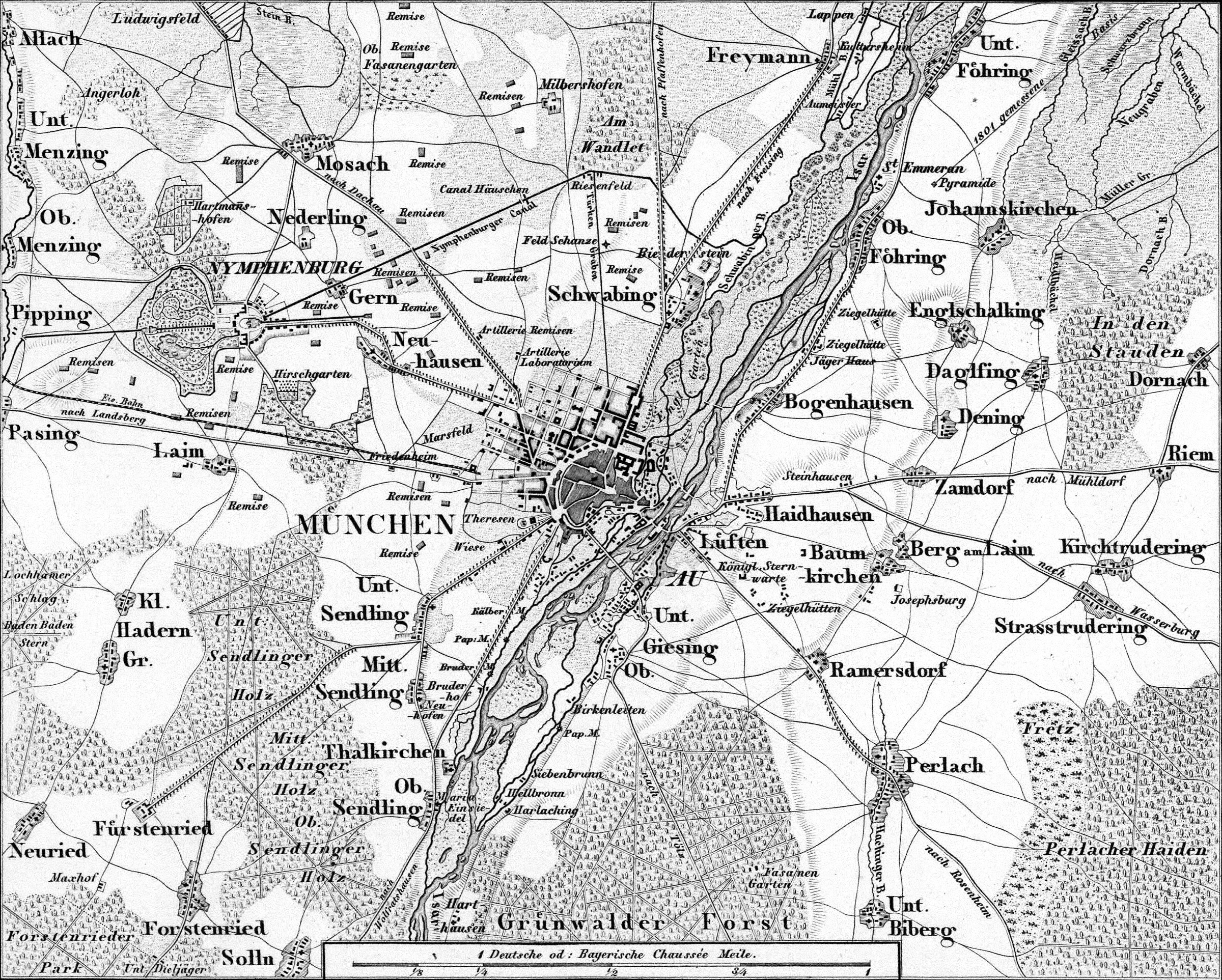
Ramersdorf and Perlach on a map from 1858

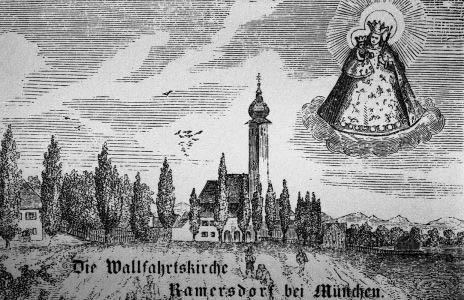
St. Mary's Church

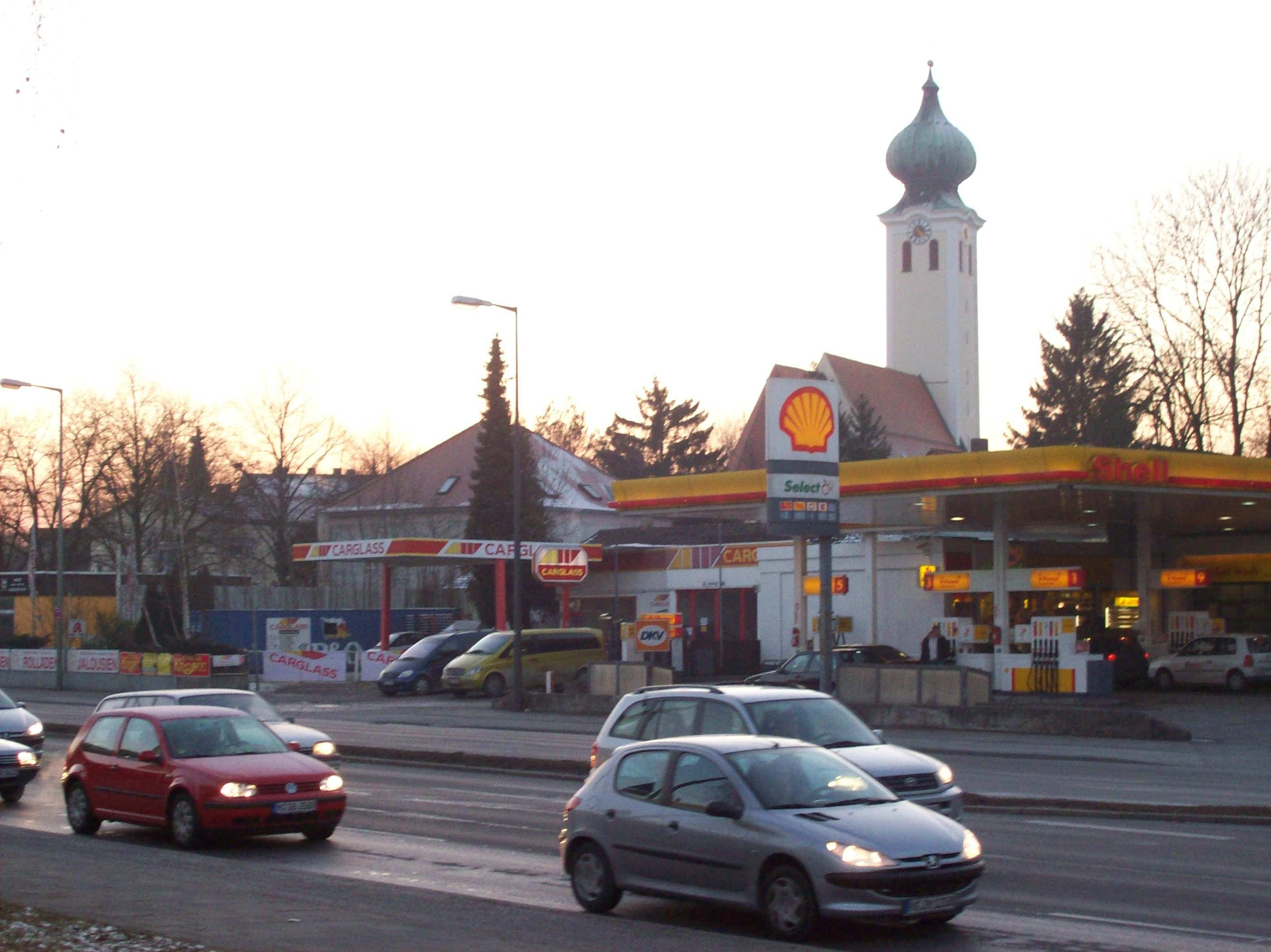
Ramersdorf with Middle Ring

Rumoltesdorf was first mentioned in documents between 1006 and 1022 in a Freising document transcript. However, the suffix -dorf suggests that a settlement may have already existed in the second half of the 9th century, especially since individual members of the Rumoltes family have been attested in documents since the 8th century. From the 13th to the 16th century, various ministerial dynasties and patrician families are mentioned as owners of the farms; some of these properties were also given to the church as endowments until they passed back into secular ownership during the Secularisation in Bavaria in 1803. From 1818 until its incorporation into Munich in 1864, Ramersdorf was a separate municipality. A far-reaching transformation of the district took place during the rule of National Socialism through the large-scale road construction and with the Mustersiedlung Ramersdorf (model housing estate for Nazi Germany).

The St. Mary's Church marks the old centre of the village, which is now rather squeezed in between the Middle Ring and the access road to the Munich-Salzburg motorway. The Ramersdorf church has been documented since the beginning of the 11th century and, along with Altötting, is probably one of the oldest pilgrimage sites in Bavaria. Pilgrimages to the image of the Virgin Mary probably began at the beginning of the 14th century, and in this century a particle of the cross also came into the possession of the church. In the 15th and 16th centuries the church was rebuilt and in the 17th century extensive Baroqueisations were carried out. The present tower dates from the end of the 18th century. At the beginning of the 19th century, many votive panels and other representations that paid homage to an exuberant cult of saints were demolished "in the name of the Enlightenment". After the foundation of a parish of its own in 1907 (Maria Ramersdorf had until then been a daughter church of St. Michael Perlach), extensive restorations were undertaken, which, however, at the same time led to the discovery of older components of the church, for example from the Gothic period.

Appreciation: "Both the records of the building and pilgrimage history as well as the high-quality furnishings, including the precious cross particle and the Ramersdorf image of grace, and not least the late Gothic carved altar attributed to Erasmus Grasser, attest to the high artistic and cultural-historical value of the Ramersdorf church." (Karin Hösch)

Based on the documents, several district initiatives and organisations decided in 2005 to celebrate Ramersdorf's thousandth anniversary in 2006.

== Gallery ==
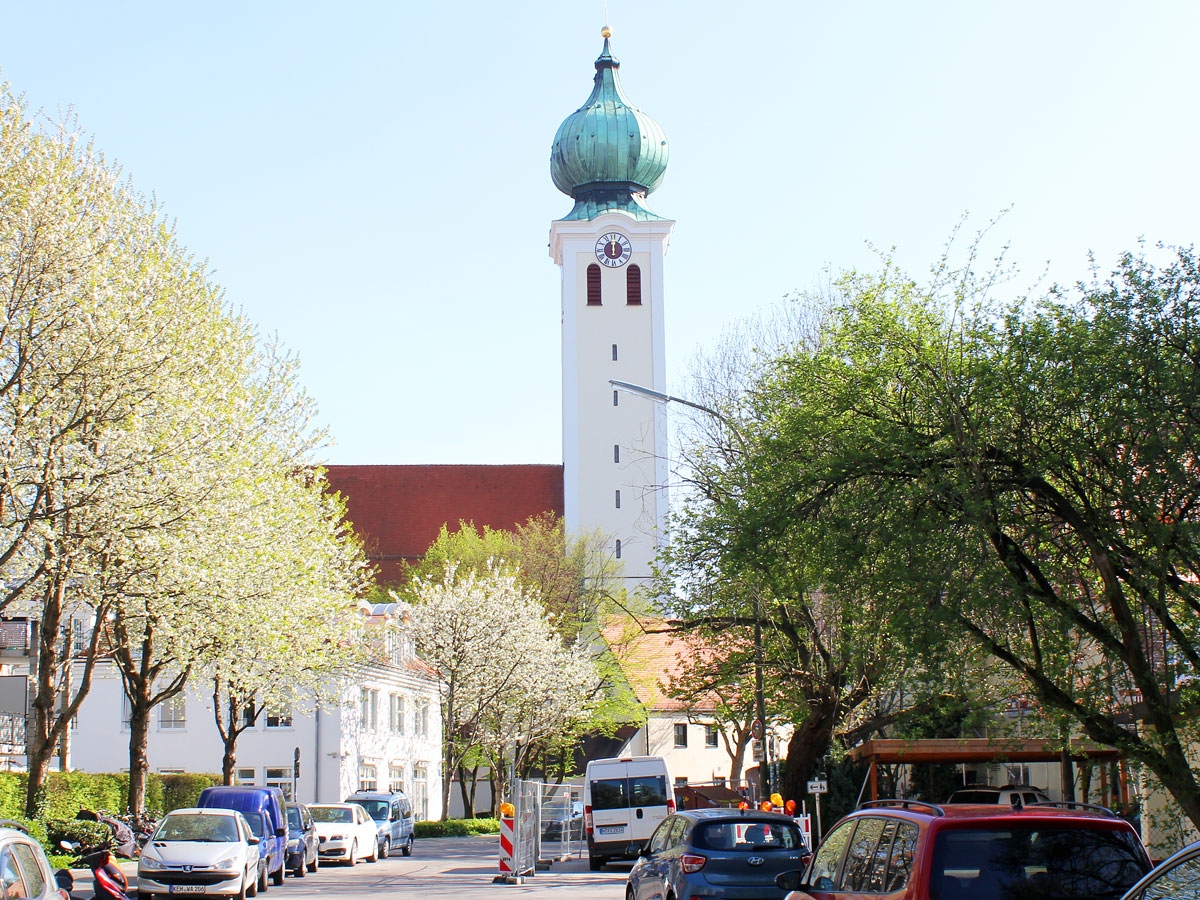
St. Mary's Church in Ramersdorf

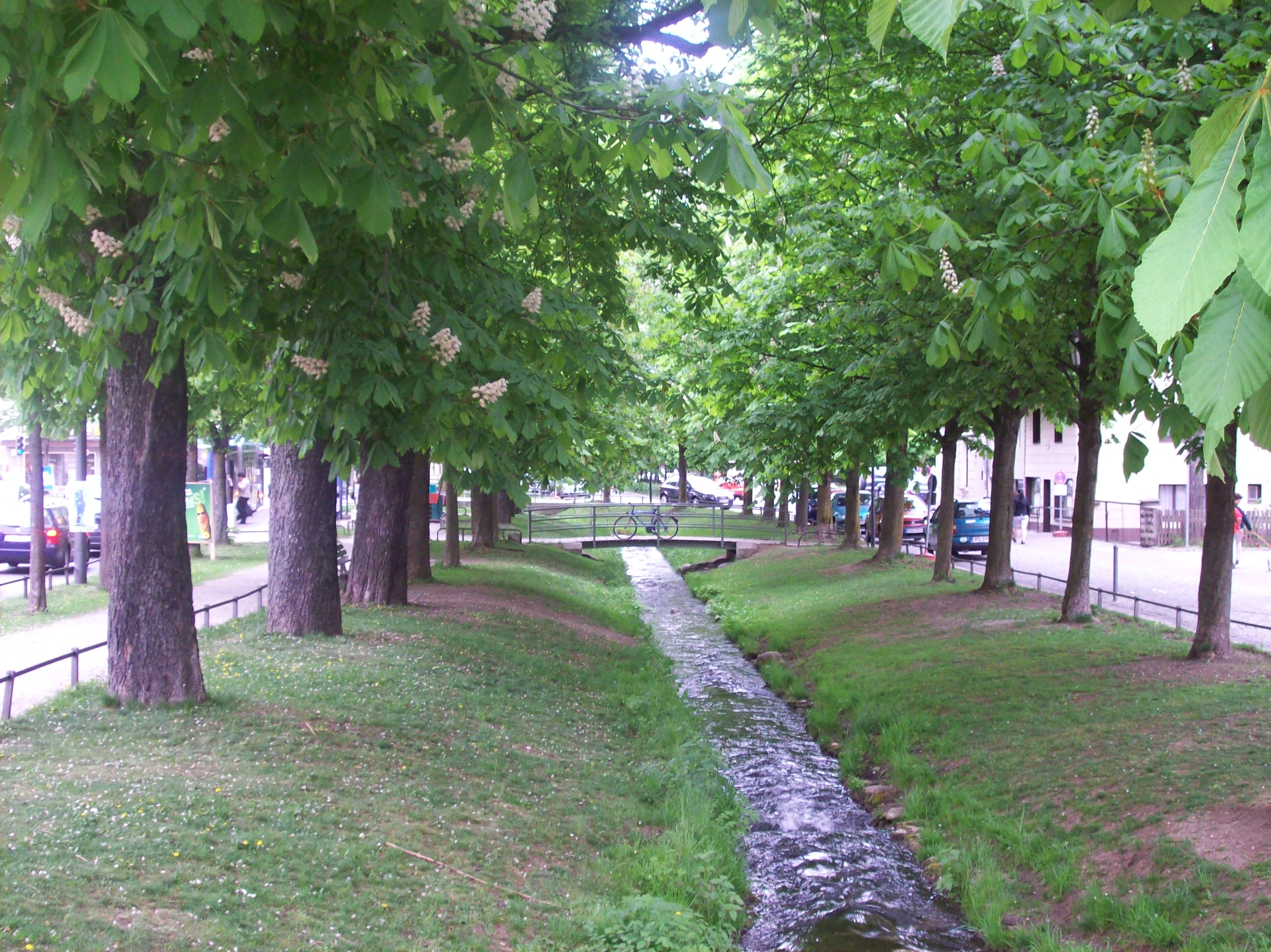
Hachinger Bach in Altperlach

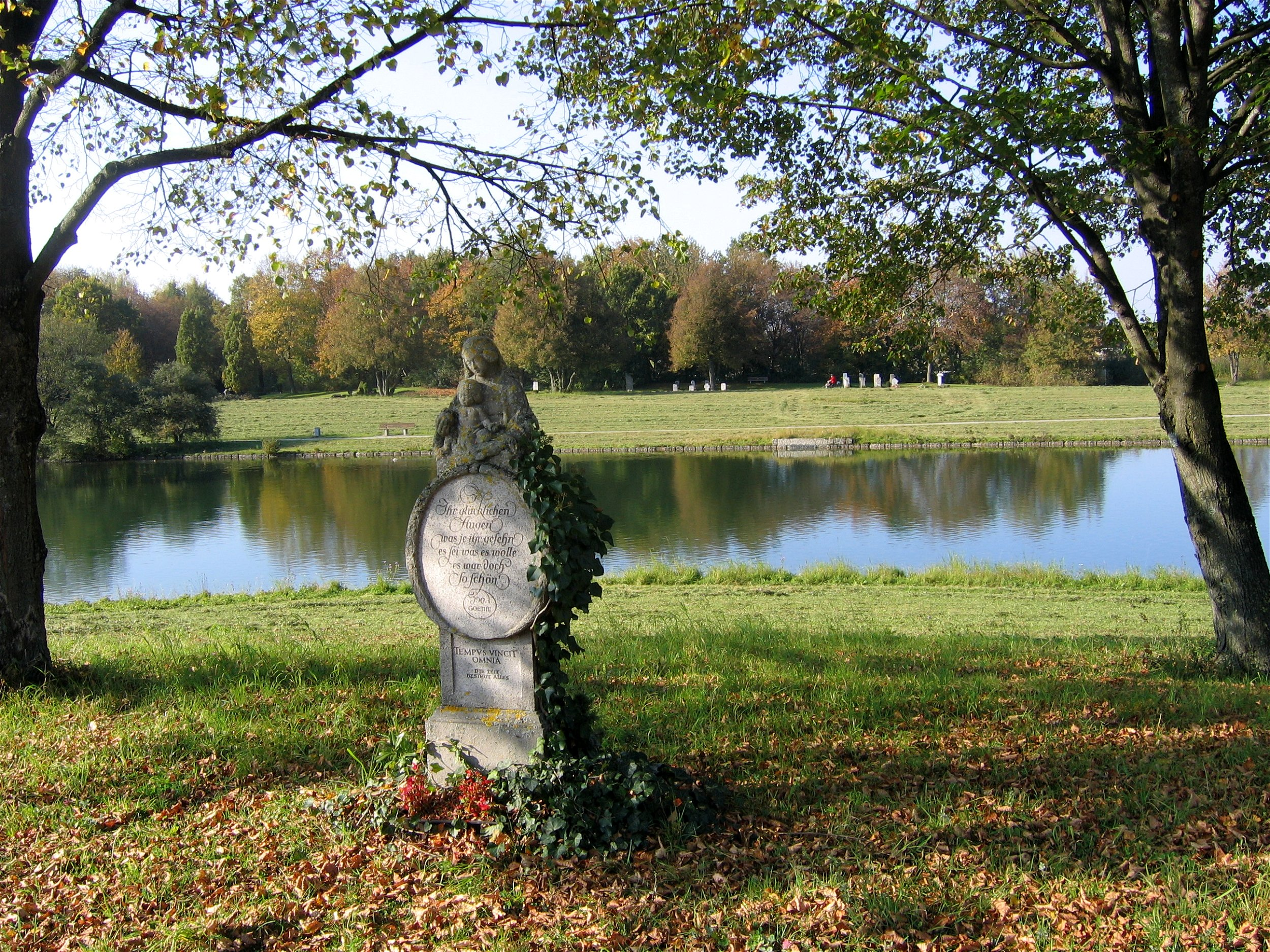
Neuer Südfriedhof in Altperlach

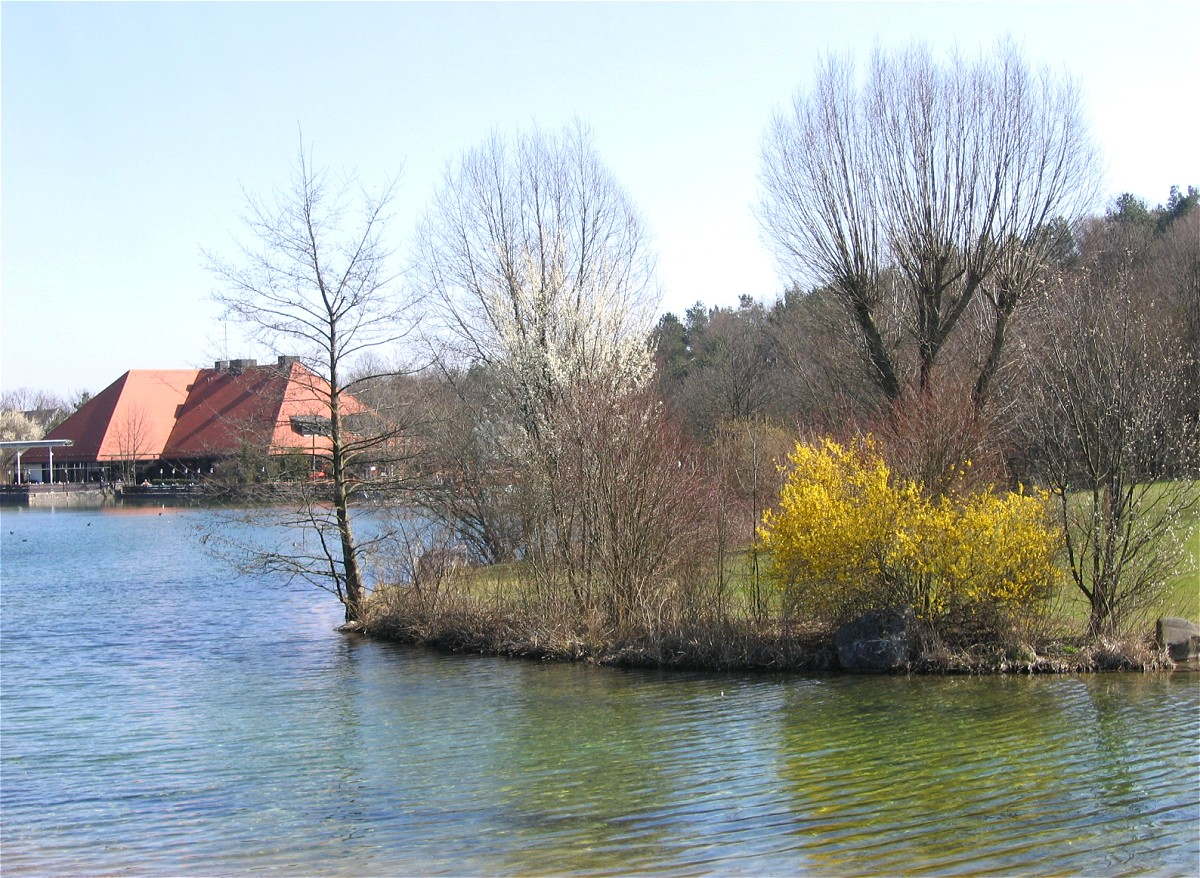
Ostpark lake in Neuperlach

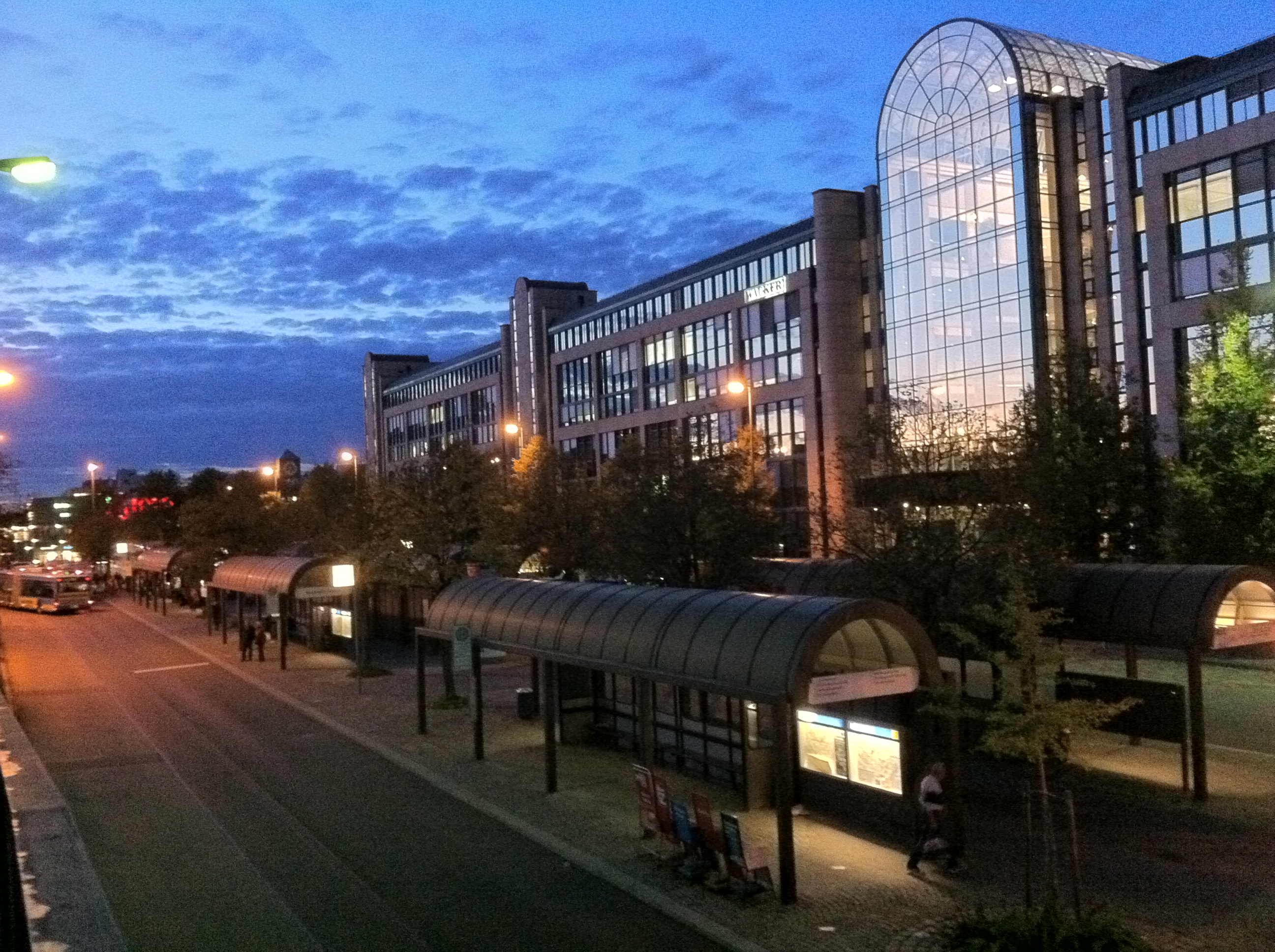
Center of Neuperlach
