= Neuperlach =

Borough in the southeast of Munich

Coordinates: 48.1000°N 11.6500°E

Neuperlach Neiperlach
- Borough
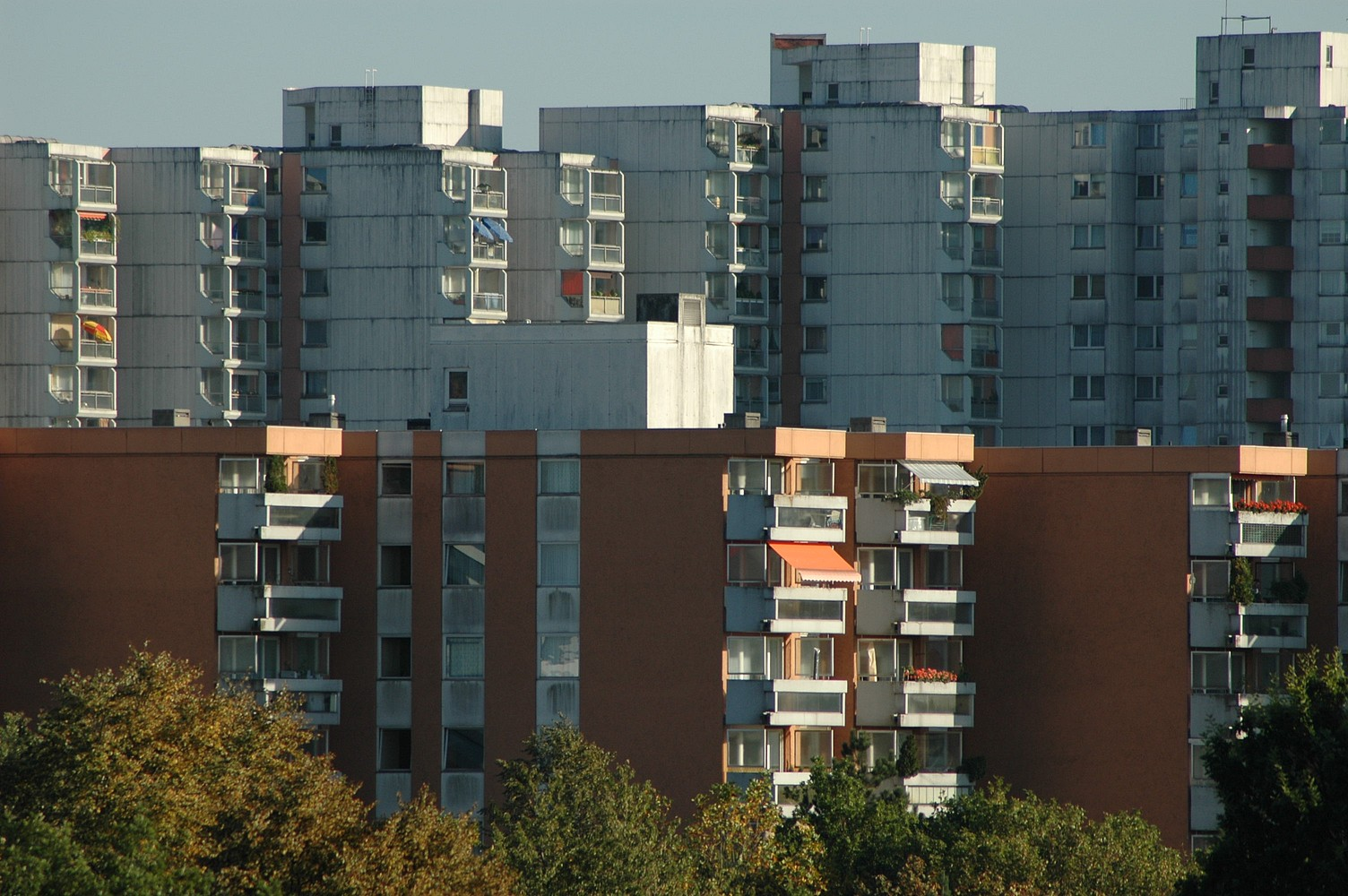
- High-rise estate in Neuperlach close to the shopping center pep

- Location in Germany
- Country: Germany
- State: Bavaria
- City: Munich
- City district: Ramersdorf-Perlach (No. 16)
- Established: 1967

Area
  - Total: 5.691 km^{2} (2.197 sq mi)

Population (2023)
  - Total: 52,376

Neuperlach (Central Bavarian: Neiperlach) is a borough in the southeast of the Bavarian capital, Munich and is part of the city district no. 16, Ramersdorf-Perlach. It was conceived starting from 1963 to address a severe housing shortage in Munich at the time.

== A new Perlach ==
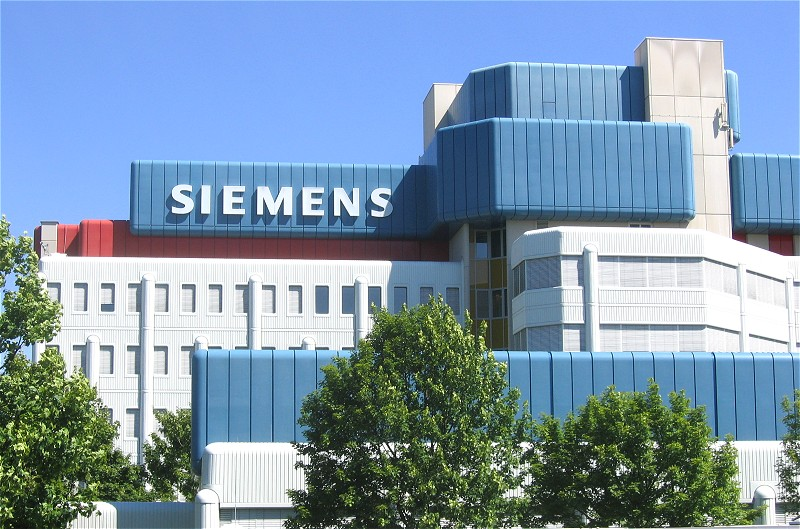
The Siemens AG in München Perlach

Construction began in 1967 east of the former village of Perlach on the ground of the former Perlacher Haid. Neuperlach is located east of the boroughs Ramersdorf and Perlach, south of the city districts no. 14 (Berg am Laim) and no. 15 (Trudering-Riem), west of the borough Waldperlach and north of Unterbiberg (which is part of the municipality of Neubiberg). The borough encompasses multiplehousing estates, including several high-rise estates, and is one of Germany's biggest satellite towns.

In the center of Neuperlach, the large pep shopping mall is located, one of the most profitable shopping centers in Germany. Neuperlach is well-connected to the city through the U5 U-Bahn route. The Hachinger Bach runs through the western part of Neuperlach from north to south, and also passes through the western part of the Ostpark.
