= Munich Stadtmuseum =

City museum of Munich, Germany

Coordinates: 48°08′6.36″N 11°34′22.98″E

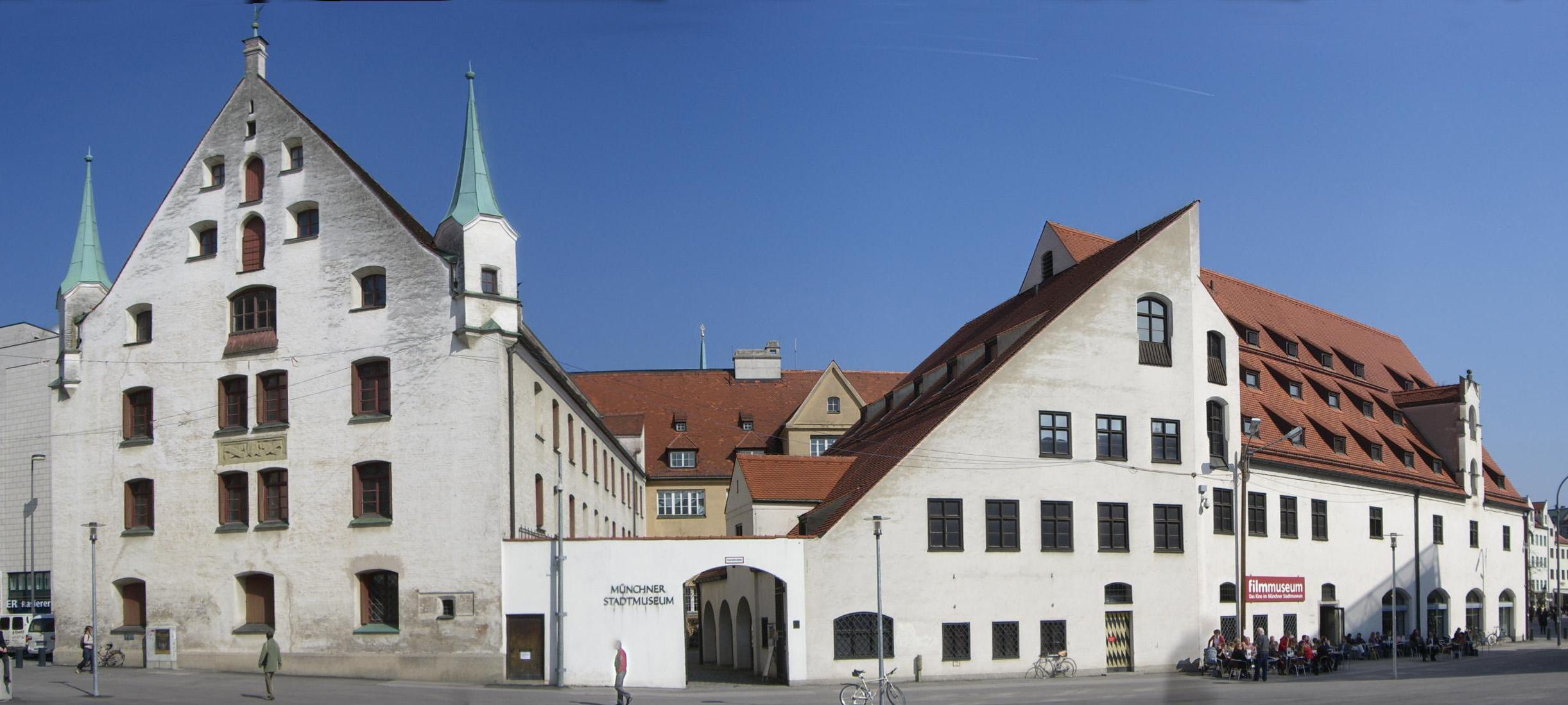
Munich Stadtmuseum

Munich Stadtmuseum

The Munich Stadtmuseum (German: "Münchner Stadtmuseum") or Munich City Museum, is the city museum of Munich. It was founded in 1888 by Ernst von Destouches. It is located in the former municipal arsenal and stables, both buildings of the late Gothic period.

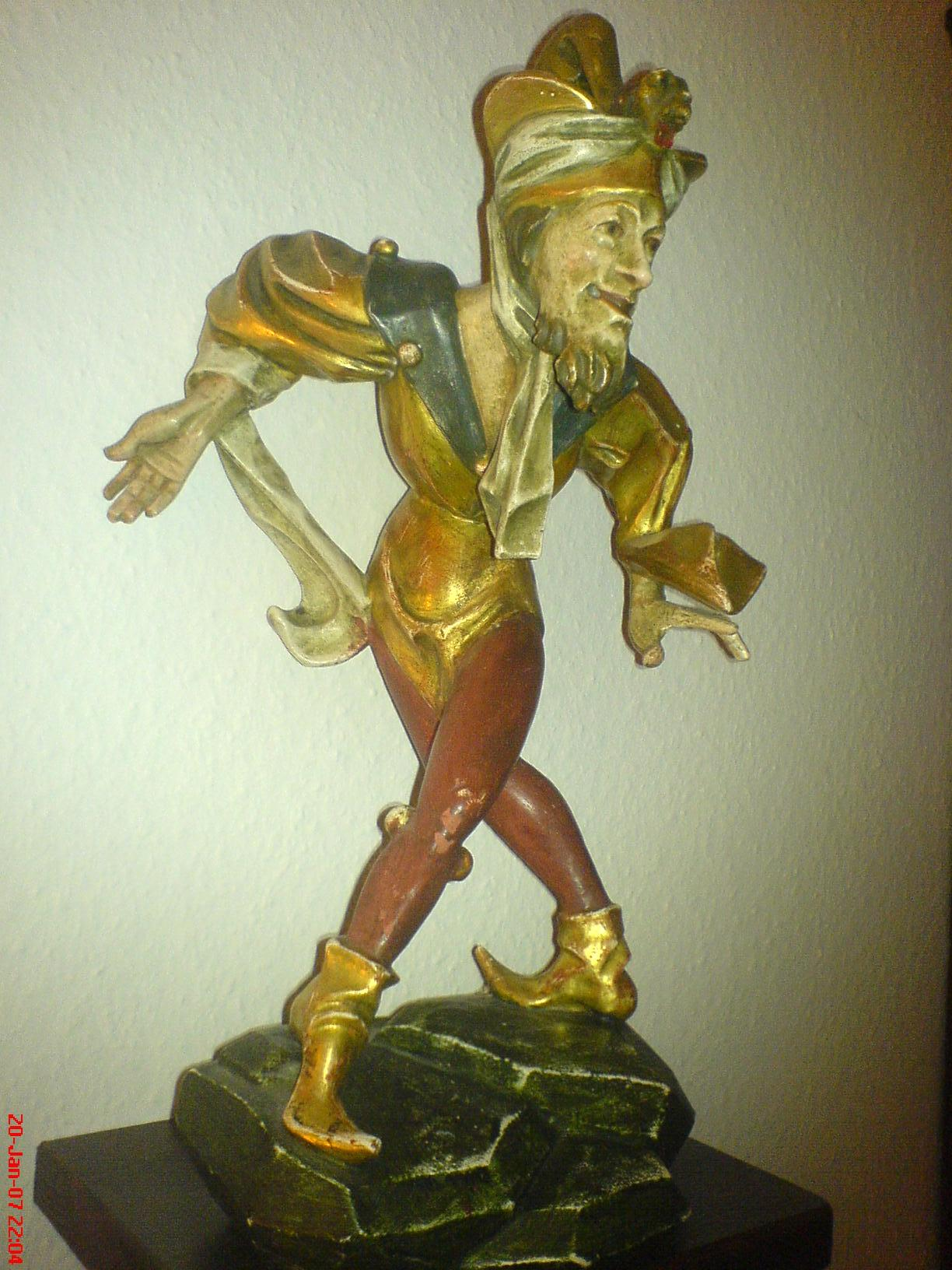
Morris dancer by Erasmus Grasser

== Permanent exhibitions ==
- Culture history of Munich from the establishment of the city to the present.

The exhibition includes among many other artworks the famous gothic Morris dancers, created by Erasmus Grasser for the festival hall of the Old Town Hall, and the original puttos of the Mary's Column.

- National Socialism in Munich

This exhibitions explains the history of the former "Hauptstadt der Bewegung" (Capital of the [Nazi] Movement).

- Music collection:

More than 2.000 musical instruments from Africa, America, Asia and Europe belong to this grand collection.

- Puppet theatre collection:

This collection displays the cultural history of the puppet theatre.

- Photography collection:

The Fotomuseum was founded in 1963. Boasting nearly 1 million photos out of some three million items, it ranks among the leading collections in Europe.

- Museum of film:

The museum with its large archive shows weekly screenings and has once become well known for the restoration of movies of Fritz Lang, Ernst Lubitsch, Georg Wilhelm Pabst and Friedrich Wilhelm Murnau.
