= Einkaufs-Center Neuperlach – pep =

Coordinates: 48°06′03″N 11°38′40″E

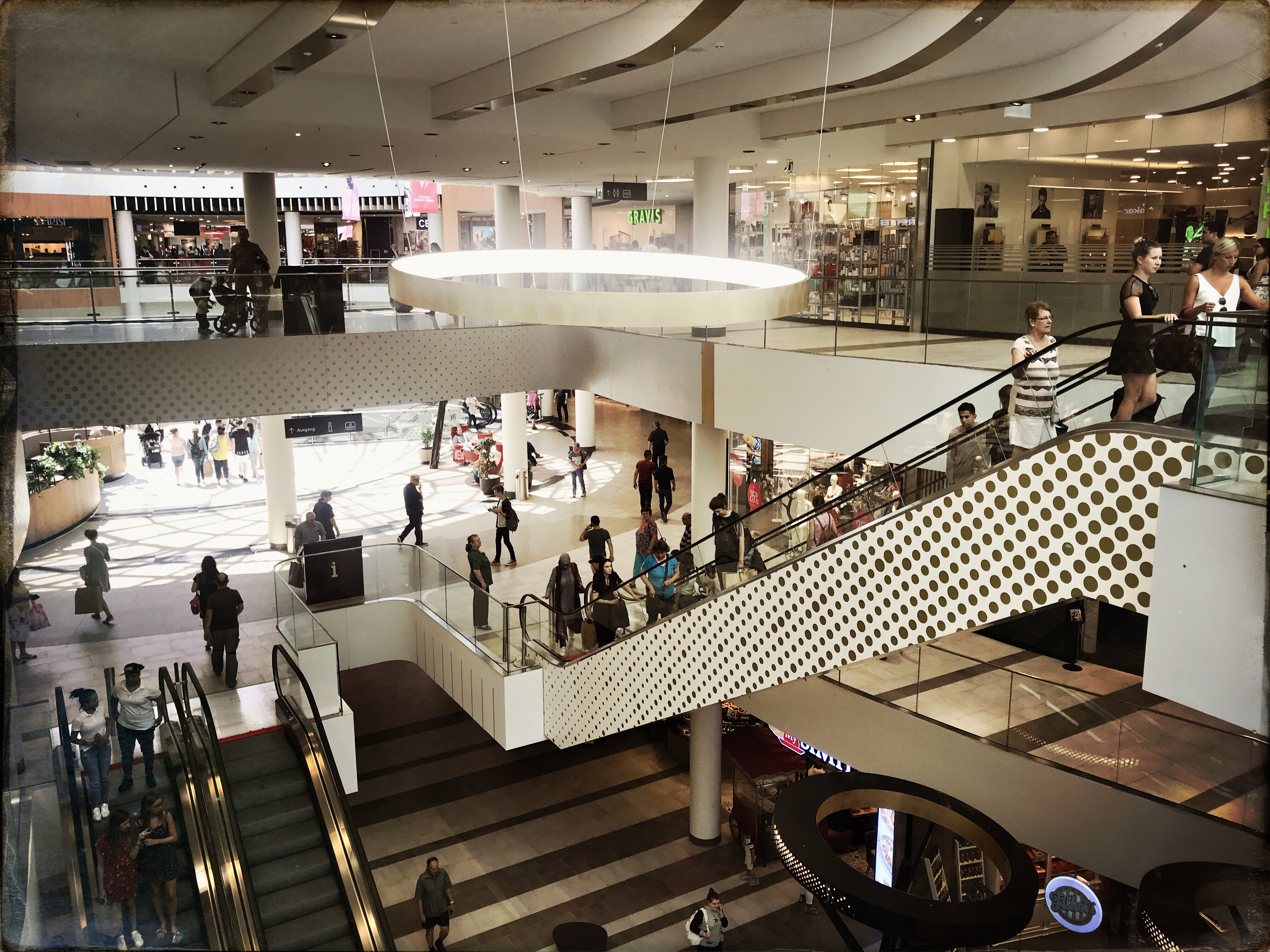
- The pep after its redesign in 2018.
- Location: Neuperlach, Munich, Germany
- Address: Ollenhauerstr.6, 81737 München
- Opened: 5 March 1981
- Developer: ECE Projektmanagement
- Owner: TIAA-CREF
- Architect: Ernst Hürlimann
- Num. of stores: >135
- Floor area: 60,000m^{2}
- Parking: 2,000
- Website: www.pep-muenchen.de

The Einkaufs-Center Neuperlach – pep (also Perlacher Einkaufspassagen) is a shopping mall in Munich's Neuperlach borough operated by ECE. With a floor space of 60,000 square meters and about 135 specialty shops, it was according to a survey for the year 2002, the most profitable shopping center in Germany, the average revenue per square meter was twice as high as the national average. In designing the state capital, it is recognized as an integrated site with the function of a district center, and through its size has an important role for the entire southeast of the metropolitan Munich.

== History ==
The shopping center was, like the surrounding district of Neuperlach, built by the real estate developer Neue Heimat. It summed up three existing neighborhood centers at the time, the Quiddezentrum, the Plettenbergzentrum and the Marxzentrum as a center for non-daily needs. At its opening on 5 March 1981, after three years of construction, it represented 65 shops on a total area of 30,000 square meters at that time. The realization was taken over by architect Ernst Hürlimann, to which design elements were integrated, including a five-meter high stone oak tree in the center of the building and a red brick floor.

In 1984 the property was purchased, for the equivalent of €54 million, by Deutsche Grundbesitz-Investment Gesellschaft mbH (DGI) which was a subsidiary of Deutsche Bank. The previously planned acquisition of the new home by a medium-sized tenants consortium, which also included the member of parliament Henry Traublinger did not materialize.

On November 23, 1989, the DGI opened the expansion at the Thomas-Dehler-Str. with 30 additional shops. The key component of the new building was a glass dome with 24 meters in diameter. Two loading zones that were created through the expansion, both of which are created as a roundel and are connected by a central block, still exists today. A further expansion and modernization took place in October 2000. The operation of the shopping center was taken over in 1990 by the ECE project management.

== Redevelopment ==
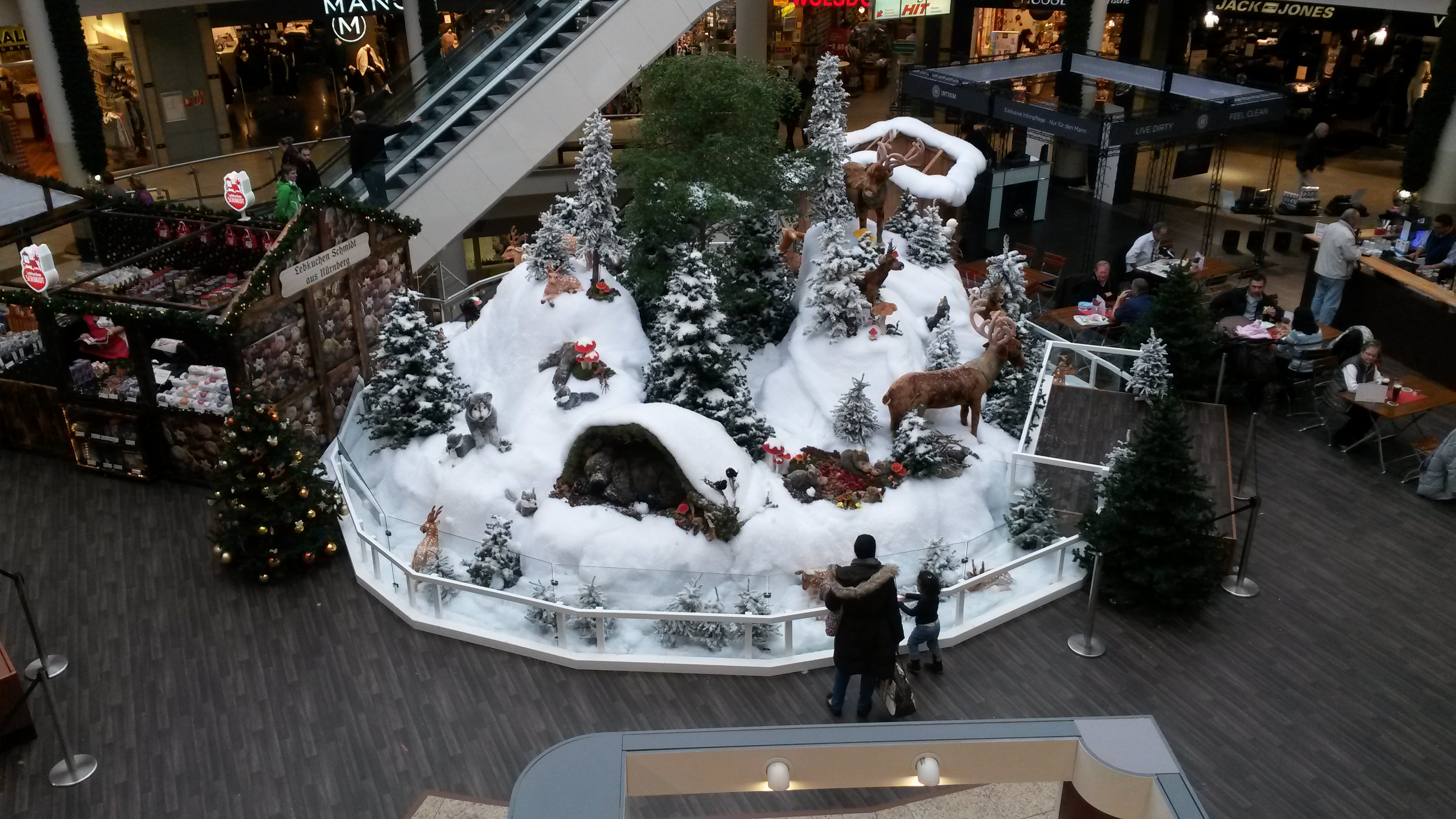
The shopping mall in winter 2014

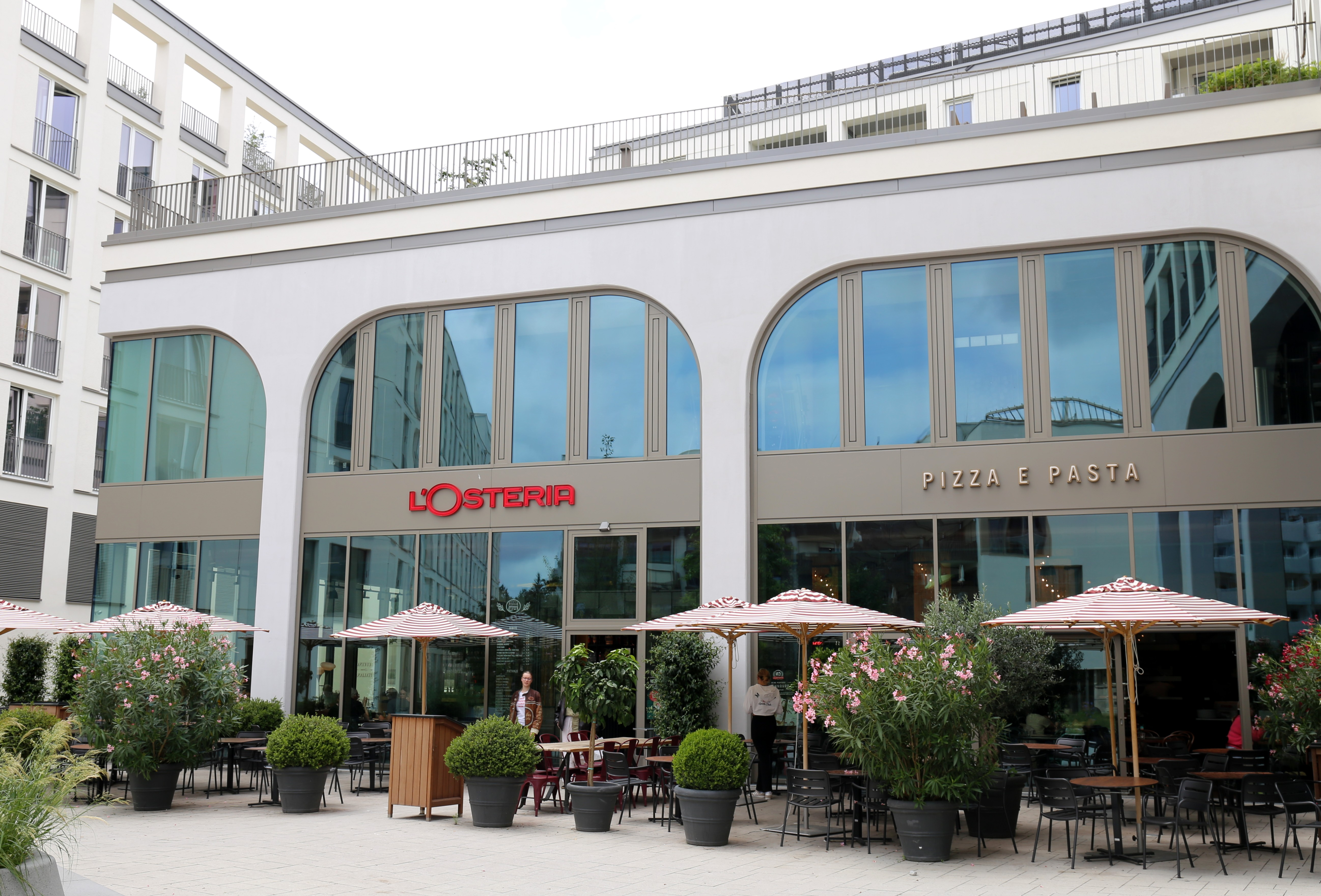
Perlach Plaza in summer 2024

In 2003, the store sales in the PEP amounted to €336 million. Developers and operators thought out a further extension, which extends beyond the multilane Thomas Dehler road on the opposite Hanns-Seidel-Platz and should create 24,000 square feet of additional retail space. Which will border a municipal cultural and community center to be built at the expense of the developer. A planning expert commissioned by the city spoke out against the extension because no local demand was evident and, among other things, the area, which a significant proportion purchasing power is skimmed off, extended along the Bundesautobahn 8 until well into the foothills of the Alps. The expansion plans were not pursued after another shopping center in the east of Munich had been opened in the proposed area with the Riem Arcaden in Messestadt Riem.

In November 2011, Reeff investment, the former DGI, sold the property for €408 million to an institutional investor in the US, the teachers pension fund TIAA-CREF.

== Transportation connection ==
The pep is located on the subway station Neuperlach Zentrum of the U5 line. A large bus terminal with local and regional bus routes is located east of Thomas Dehler street, at the Hanns-Seidl-Platz. Where the bus lines 55, 139, 192, 196, 197, 198 and 199 make a stop. In addition, there is a taxi stand in the forecourt.

By car the pep is accessible via the Ständlerstraße in the north or the Putzbrunner road in the south (both east-west direction) and the Thomas Dehler road (north-south). Directly on the pep there are two car parks with a total of only 2000-space (formerly 3000). There is a fee for the use of both car parks since the beginning of June 2012.
