= Hachinger Bach =

River in Germany

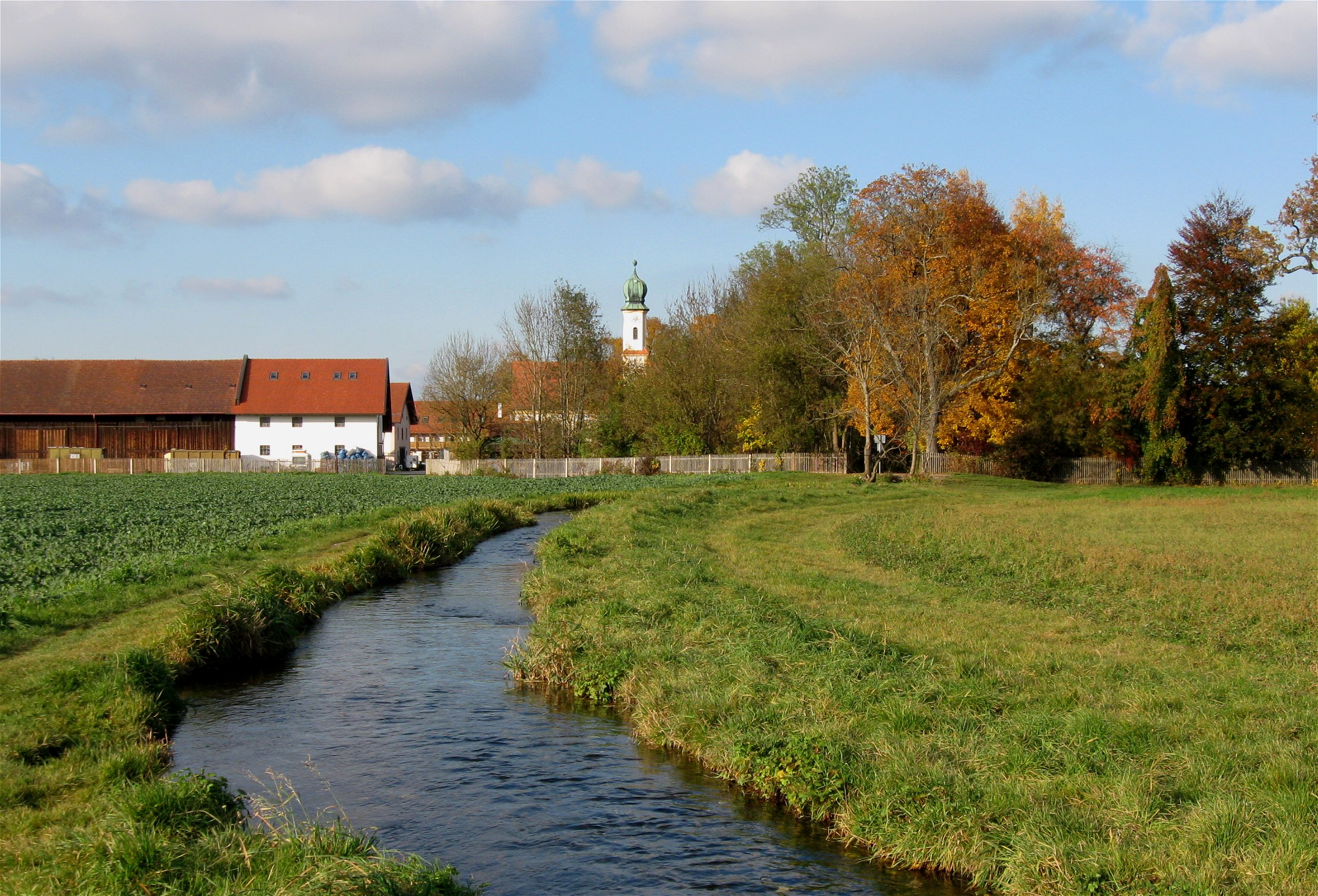
- The Hachinger Bach in Unterbiberg

Location
- Country: Germany
- State: Bavaria

Physical characteristics
- Source
  - coordinates: 48.021111°N 11.594722°E

Basin features
- River system: Danube

The Hachinger Bach is a river in Bavaria, Germany. It flows southwards of Munich, through the townships of Oberhaching, Taufkirchen, Unterhaching and Unterbiberg (a part of Neubiberg), and enters the Munich city area in Perlach. It is twelve kilometers long.

== Name ==
The name of the stream is derived from the Hacho Bavarii, who built settlements along the stream in the 5th and 8th centuries.

== Source ==
The source of the Hachinger Bach is in a former glacial valley between the districts of Deisenhofen and Oberhaching, where water from the Deininger wetland flows as groundwater through the Gleißental, which connects to the Hachinger Tal. About 100 metres into the Hachinger Tal, the ground becomes progressively wetter due to exudation of groundwater, until a small stream forms. Due to fluctuations in the water table, no location can be assigned as the source.

To keep the stream from running dry, water is piped into it. The stream is further fed by additional groundwater and influx from sources such as the Taufkirchen duckpond. The flint layer that had kept the groundwater close to the surface, allowing the stream to form, drops deeper just north of Unterhaching, which also causes the water table to drop. That would have caused the river to go underground in the gravel of the Munich floodplain, but due to the formation of a silt bed caused by the stream itself, it only goes underground just north of Ostpark at the borders of the districts of Perlach, Ramersdorf and Berg am Laim.

== History ==
Like almost all waterways in Germany, the Hachinger Bach was regulated in the past, and had its course altered to suit current requirements, for example, being routed around Neubiberg air base. In the meantime, long sections of the riverbed were restored, for example in the Hachinger Tal landscape park at the location of the previous airfield.

Since the 1980s, the residents of Berg am Laim have requested that the 3.8 km section between Ostpark and Hüllgraben should be brought to the surface. From the underground intake to the Josephsburg U-Bahn station pavilion at Kreillerstraße, there is already a dry riverbed, but the original plans to route the stream to the surface at the 2005 Bundesgartenschau failed due to budget insufficiencies. In 2009 the plan was raised again at a citizens' meeting, without concrete results As of 2010.

== Route ==
The stream currently flows along the western edge of the Ostpark and then crosses under Heinrich-Wieland-Straße, and ends after a further 120 m in an intake with an automatic rake to remove fouling from the grate. An infiltration basin next to the intake serves to contain water when the flow rate is too high for the intake, to avoid flooding. Since 1933, the stream has been carried by an underground concrete pipeline from this point up to the railway triangle south of the A94 at the southernmost point of the Munich district called Bogenhausen, where it feeds the Hüllgraben, which starts from there. The pipe runs under Kampenwandstraße, turns along the Hachinger-Bach-Straße east until St.-Veit-Straße. It runs north under St.-Veit-Straße until it leads to the point when it flows into the Hüllgraben. The Hüllgraben flows into the Johanneskirchen wetland in the Abfanggraben, which flows into the central Isar canal at the Neufinsing hydroelectric station.

== In folklore ==
The stream used to dry up approximately every seven years, and would reappear in the following year. Because the connection with groundwater was not known in these days, a number of legends grew up around the stream, in which the devil was made responsible for the disappearance of the stream. Other variants describe two brothers disputing about who would inherit a mill on the stream: because they could not agree, God made the stream vanish into the earth upstream of the mill, so that it would not run anymore.

== Gallery ==
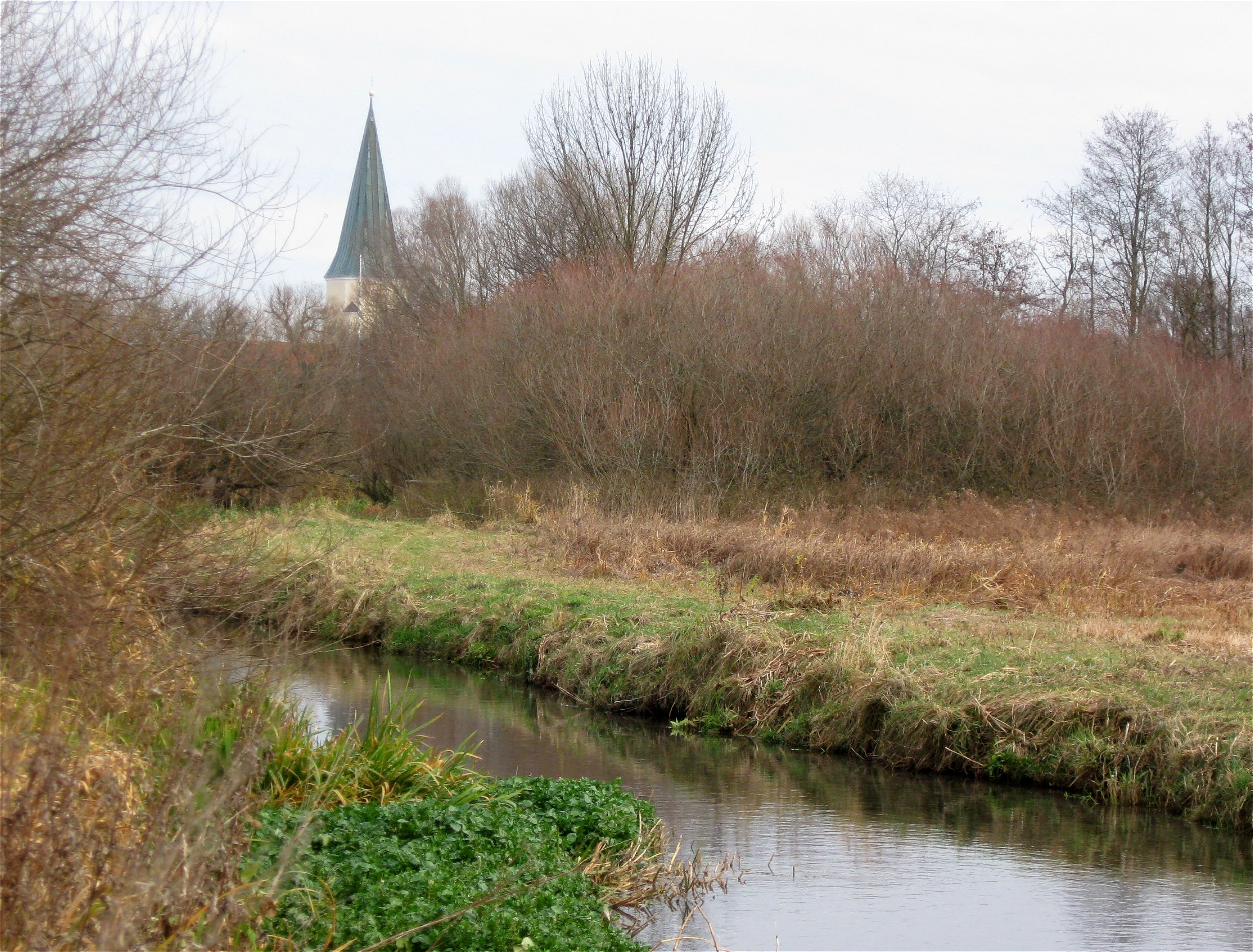
Hachinger Bach south of Taufkirchen

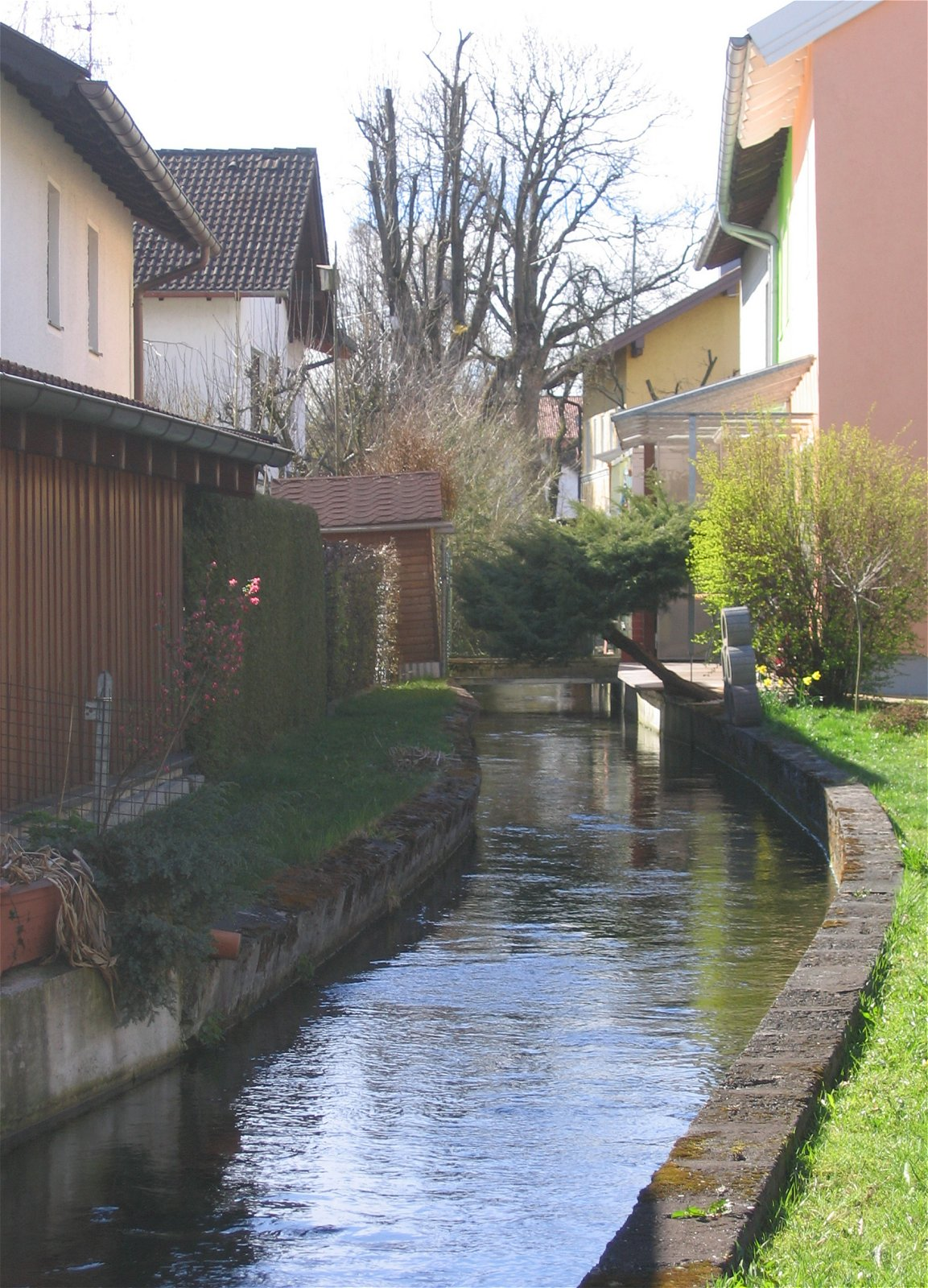
Hachinger Bach in Unterhaching

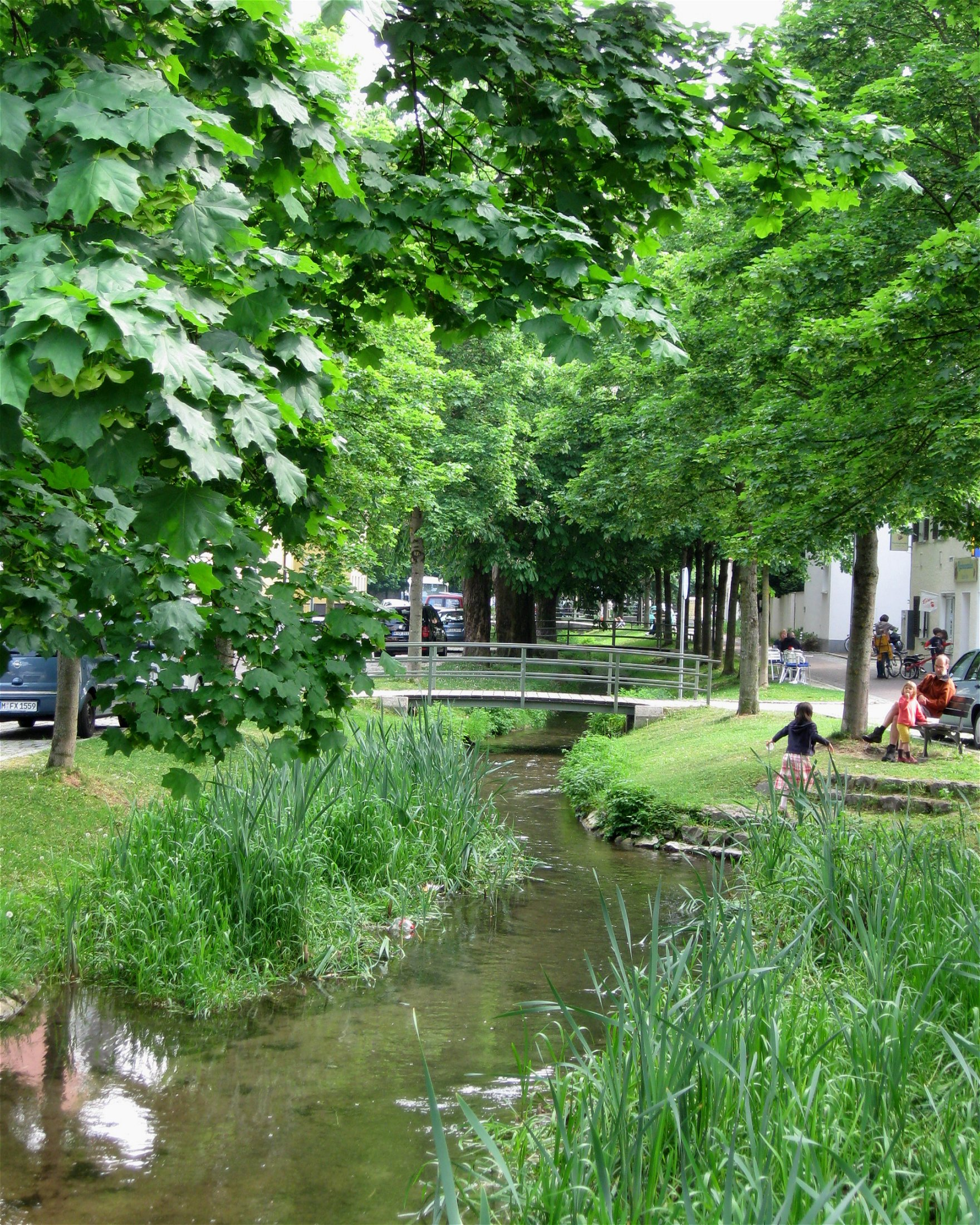
Hachinger Bach at the Pfanzeltplatz in Perlach

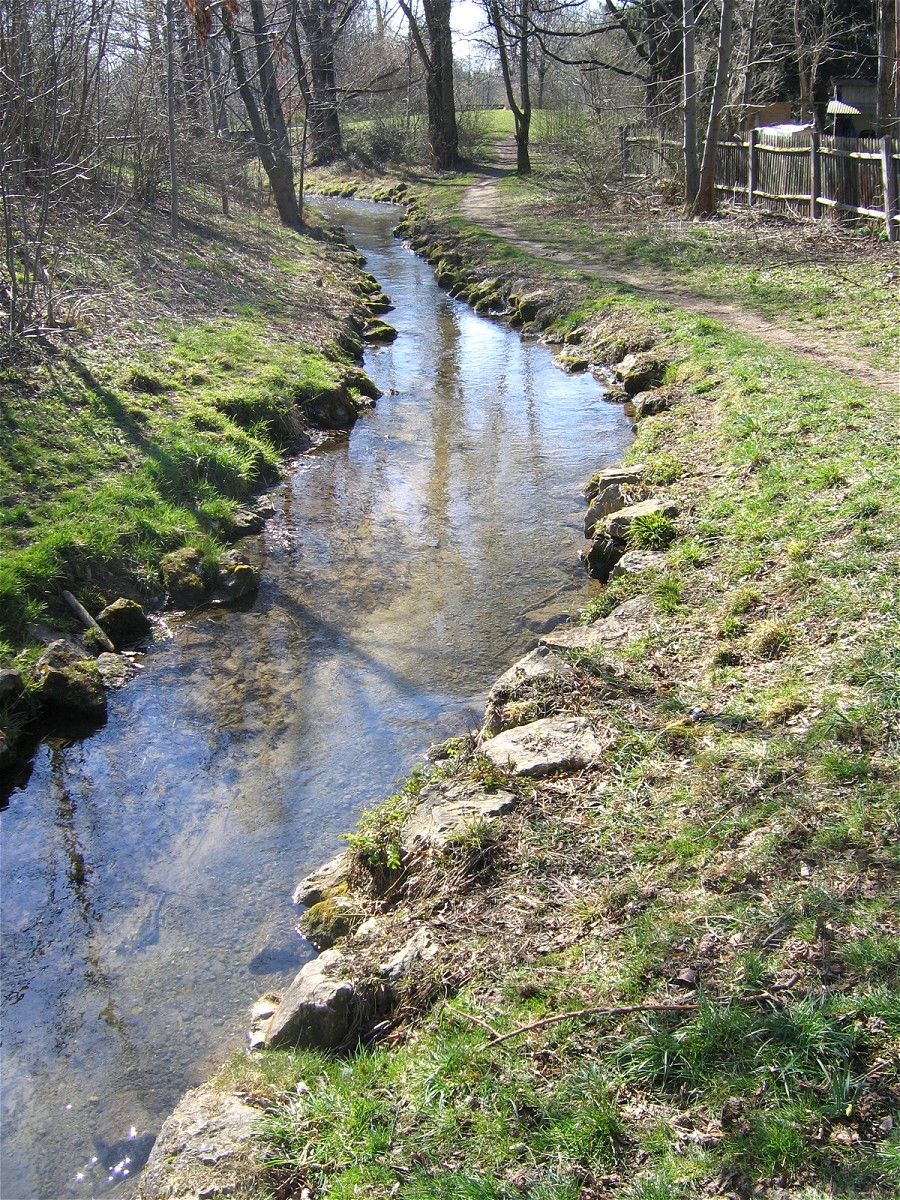
Hachinger Bach in Ostpark
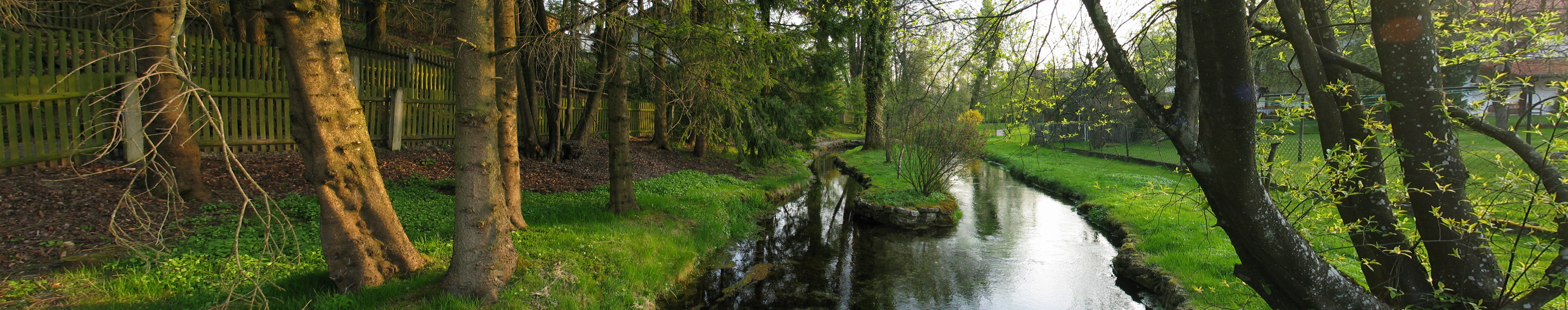
The Hachinger Bach in Furth

== See also ==
- List of rivers of Bavaria
