= St. Mary's Church, Munich =

Church in Munich, Germany

Church of St. Mary (Pfarr- und Wallfahrtskirche St Maria)
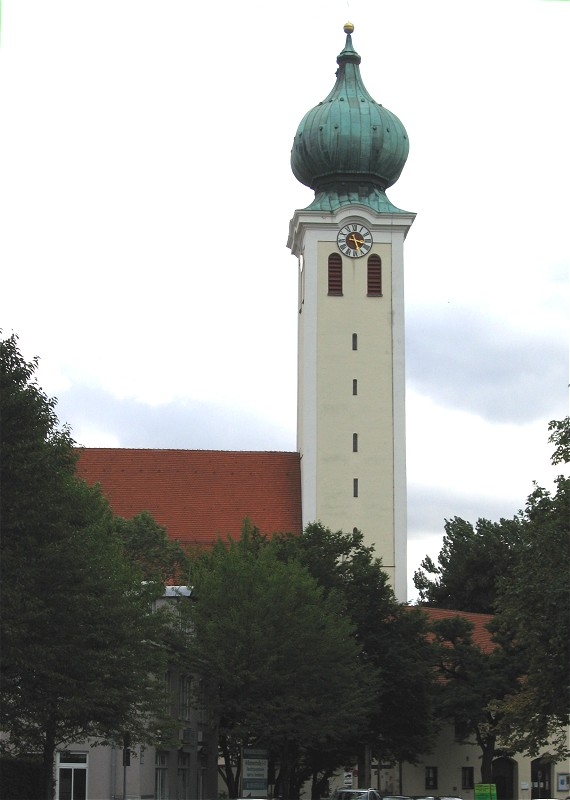
- Church tower

Religion
- Affiliation: Roman Catholic
- Diocese: Ramersdorf-Perlach
- Status: Active

Location
- Location: Ramersdorf-Perlach, Germany
- Interactive map of Church of St. Mary (Pfarr- und Wallfahrtskirche St Maria)
- Coordinates: 48°06′51″N 11°36′55″E

Architecture
- Type: Church
- Style: Baroque/Baroque

Saint Mary Ramersdorf (Sankt Maria Ramersdorf) in the district Ramersdorf-Perlach of Munich is a parish 58 m high church of pilgrimage.

== Architecture ==
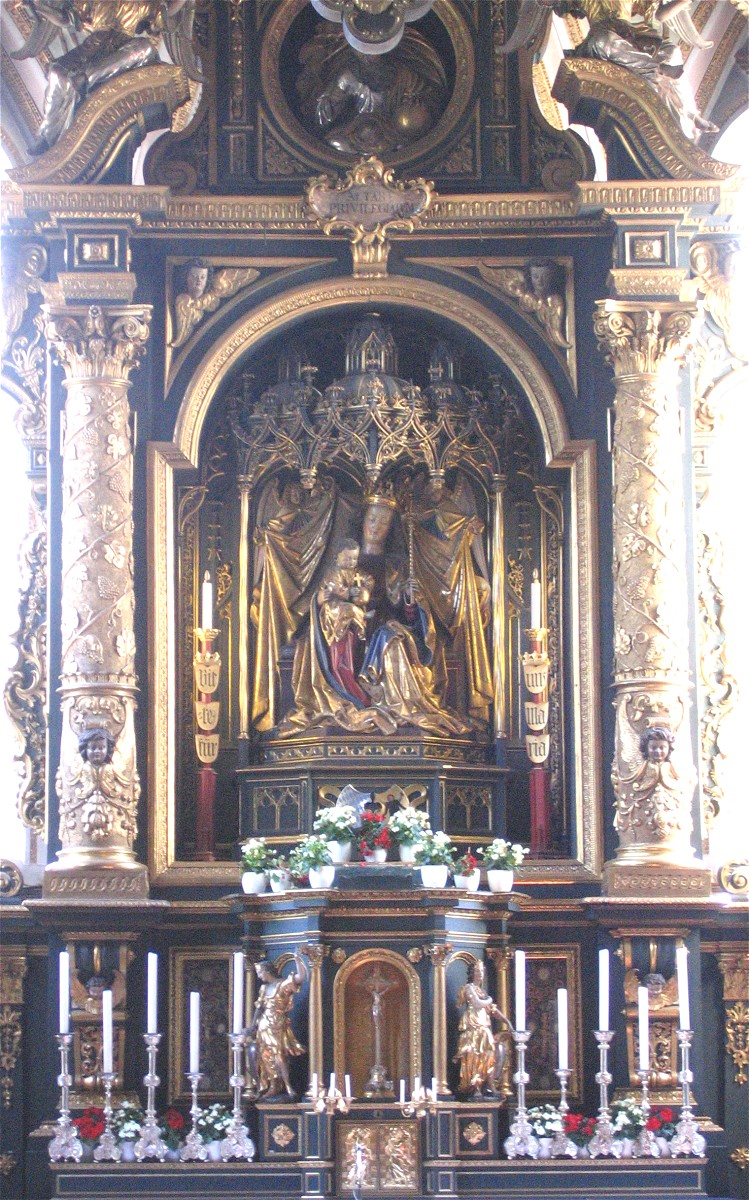
St Maria Ramersdorf, high altar

The gothic building was mentioned for the first time in a document in 1315. The pilgrimage began with a relic, a crucifix which had been handed over to Emperor Louis IV by Antipope Nicholas V and which was later donated to the church by one of the emperor's sons, likely Duke Otto V. The building was redesigned and extended shortly before 1400 in late gothic style. The Onion dome was constructed in 1791 after a lightning puncture.

The interior is decorated in baroque style during the 17th century. The high altar with an Enthroned Madonna by Erasmus Grasser and paintings by Jan Polack (ca 1480) is a major sight.
