= Erasmus Grasser =

German master builder and sculptor

Erasmus Grasser (c. 1450 – c. 1515) was a leading master builder and sculptor in Munich in the early 16th century.

== Biography ==
He developed in an animated and realistic style, furthering on the works of Nikolaus Gerhaert.

Grasser worked mainly in wood, and is best known for the 16 figures of Moriskentänzer (Moresca dancers, 1480, 10 remaining, the fate of 6 unknown) lining the walls of the great dance and assembly hall of Old Townhall, the oak choir stalls at the Frauenkirche cathedral (1502) and the madonna of the high altar in St Mary (Ramersdorf), all three located in Munich. He also created the high altar at Reichersdorf (1502–1506).

== Works ==
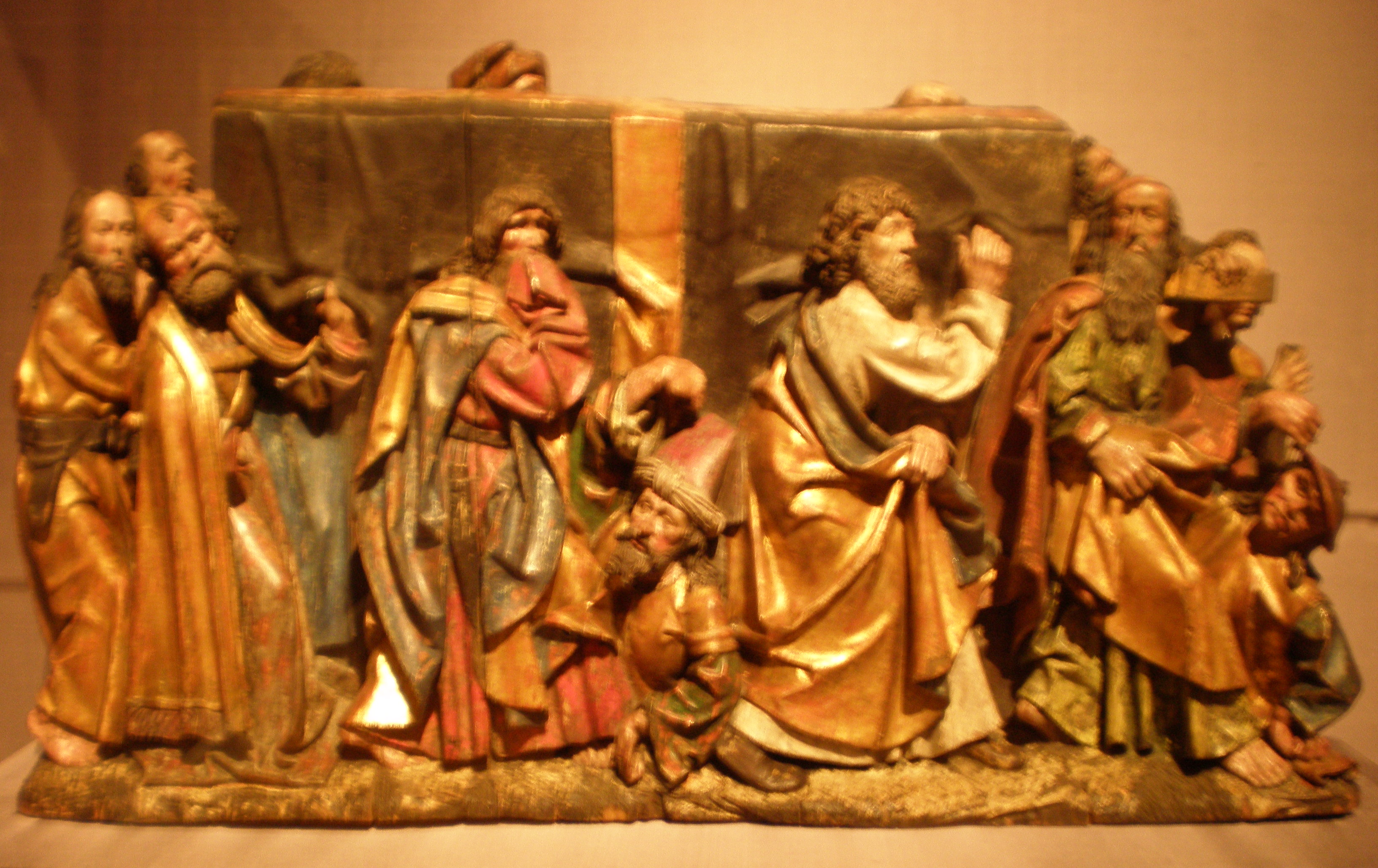
The Burial of the Virgin, by Erasmus Grasser, Late 15th Century. (in Museum Legion of Honor

Grasser is credited with creating the 'Burial of the Virgin' though it may have been a follower of his. This piece depicts Mary, the Mother of God, in a coffin being carried to her final resting place. This story is not mentioned in the Bible. In an apocryphal collection of stories called Transitus Mariae attributed to Bishop St. Melito of Sardis, Mary died in the presence of the Apostles and one version of what happened to her body is that the Apostles then buried her.

== Morris Dancers ==
Grasser was paid for the "Morris Dancers" (Moriskentänzer) in 1480. They were standing in about 5 meters height on extending consoles of the lower section of the roof of the "Dance House". This was the central, representative 1st floor of the Old Town Hall (Altes Rathaus, in use 1480/1874). The Dance House was used for events of the city as well as the ducal and royal houses. The dancer carvings were part of a heraldic roof program symbolizing the leadership claim of Duke Herzog Albrecht IV of Bavaria, showing crests of the whole world. The originals were replaced by copies in 1931 and removed to the city museum, so survived WWII destruction of the Old Town Hall. The "Dance House" was reconstructed/reopened in 1977 and is used again for events of the city today.

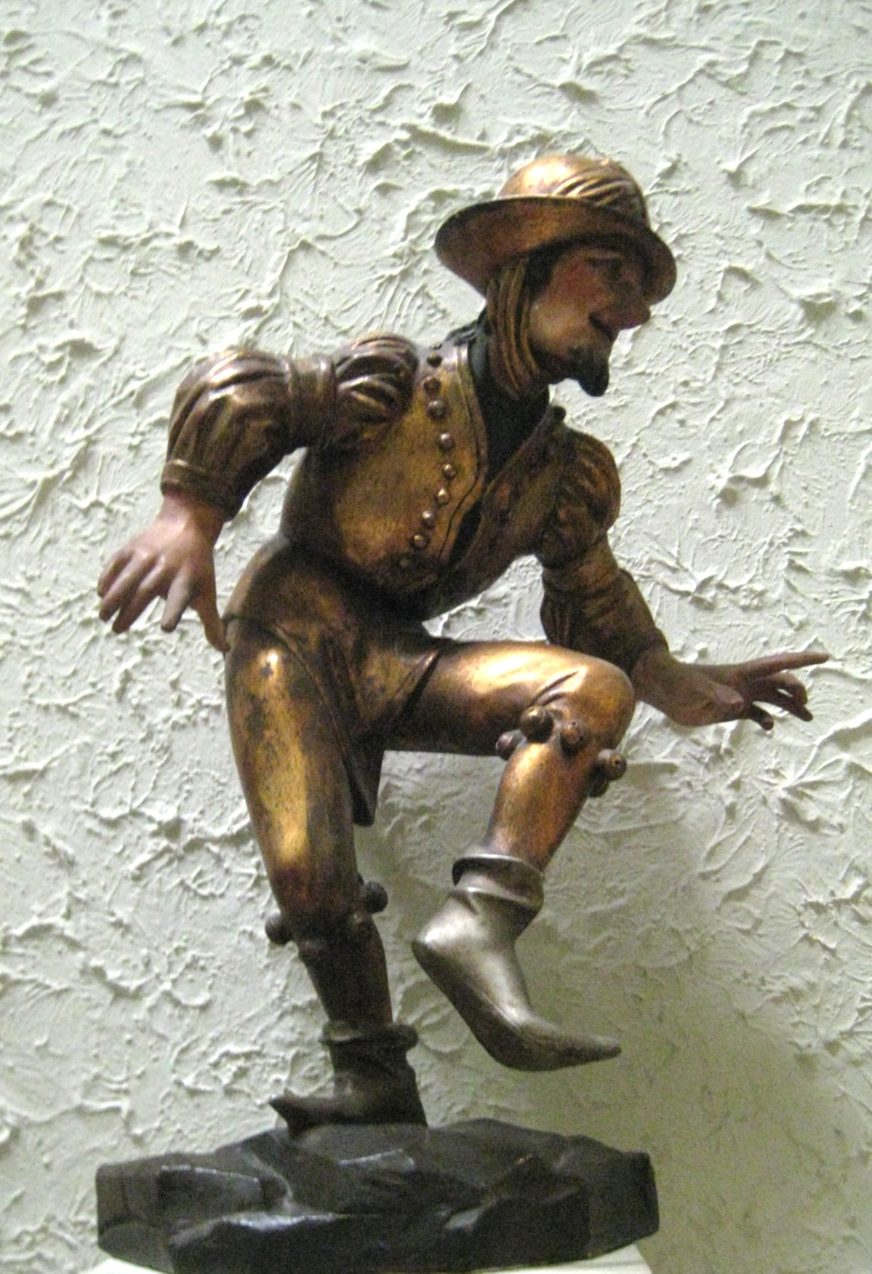
Moriskentänzer, one of 16 (now 10) Moresca Dancers by Erasmus Grasser, Munich Stadtmuseum, 1480.

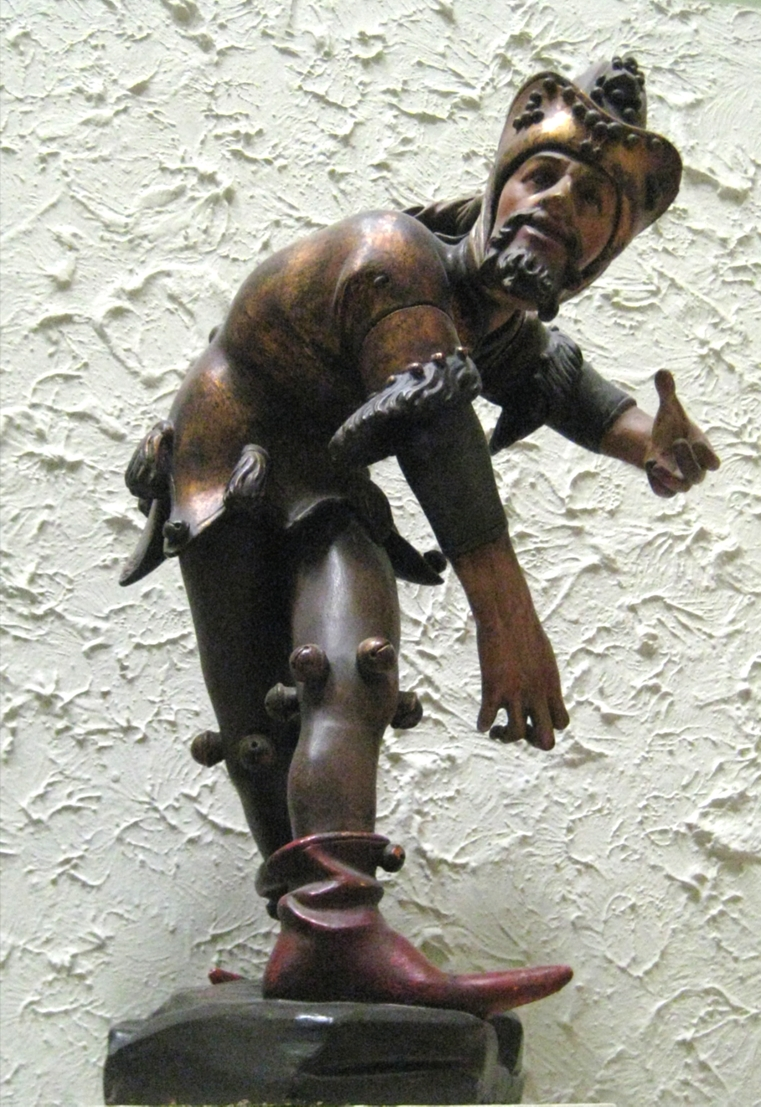
Moriskentänzer, one of 16 (now 10) Moresca Dancers by Erasmus Grasser, Munich Stadtmuseum, 1480.

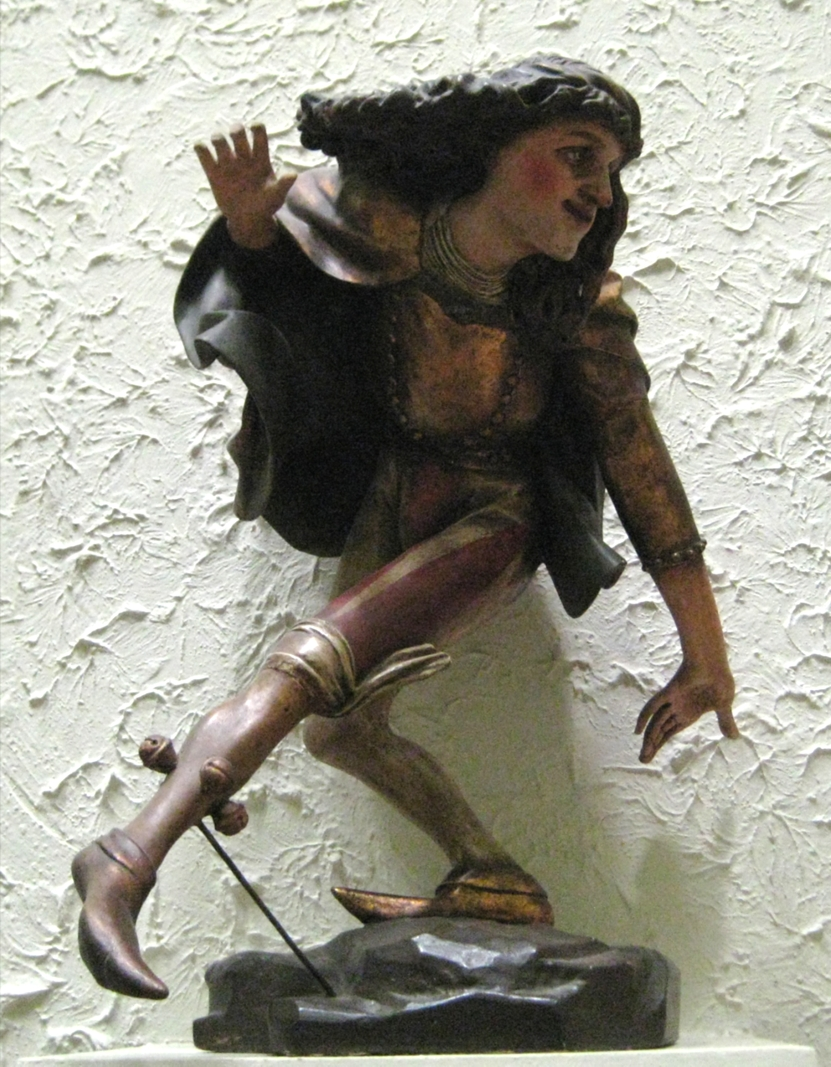
Moriskentänzer, one of 16 (now 10) Moresca Dancers by Erasmus Grasser, Munich Stadtmuseum, 1480.

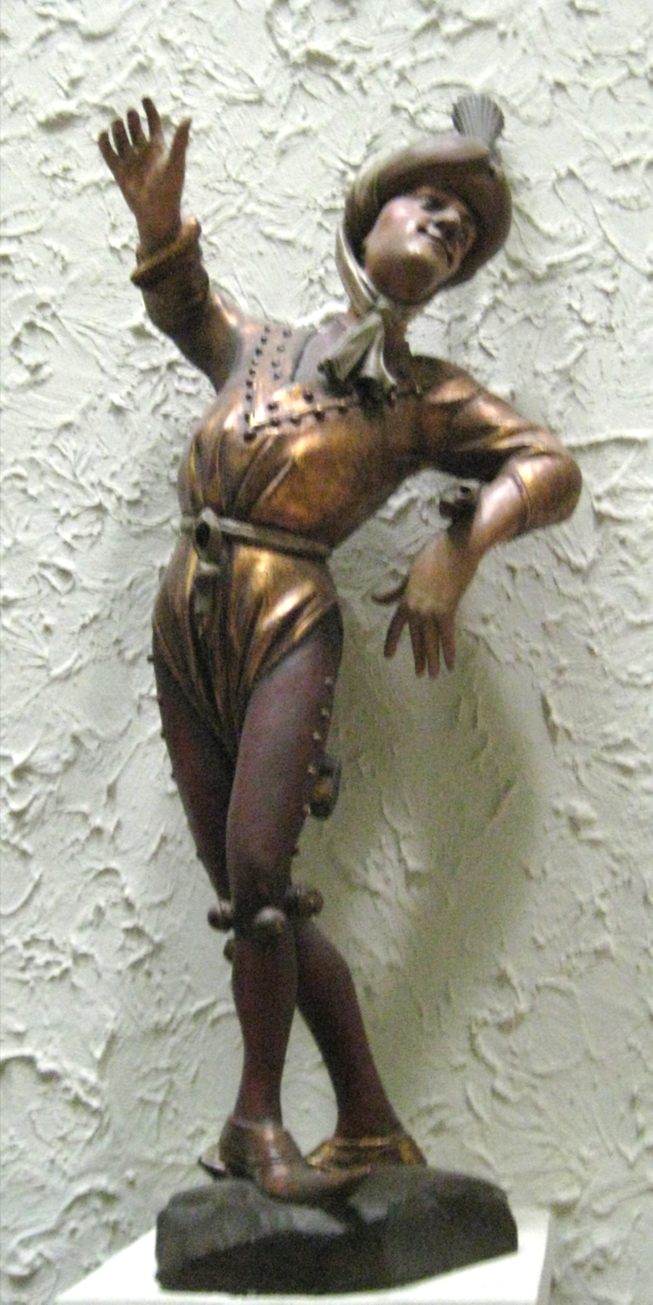
Moriskentänzer, one of 16 (now 10) Moresca Dancers by Erasmus Grasser, Munich Stadtmuseum, 1480.

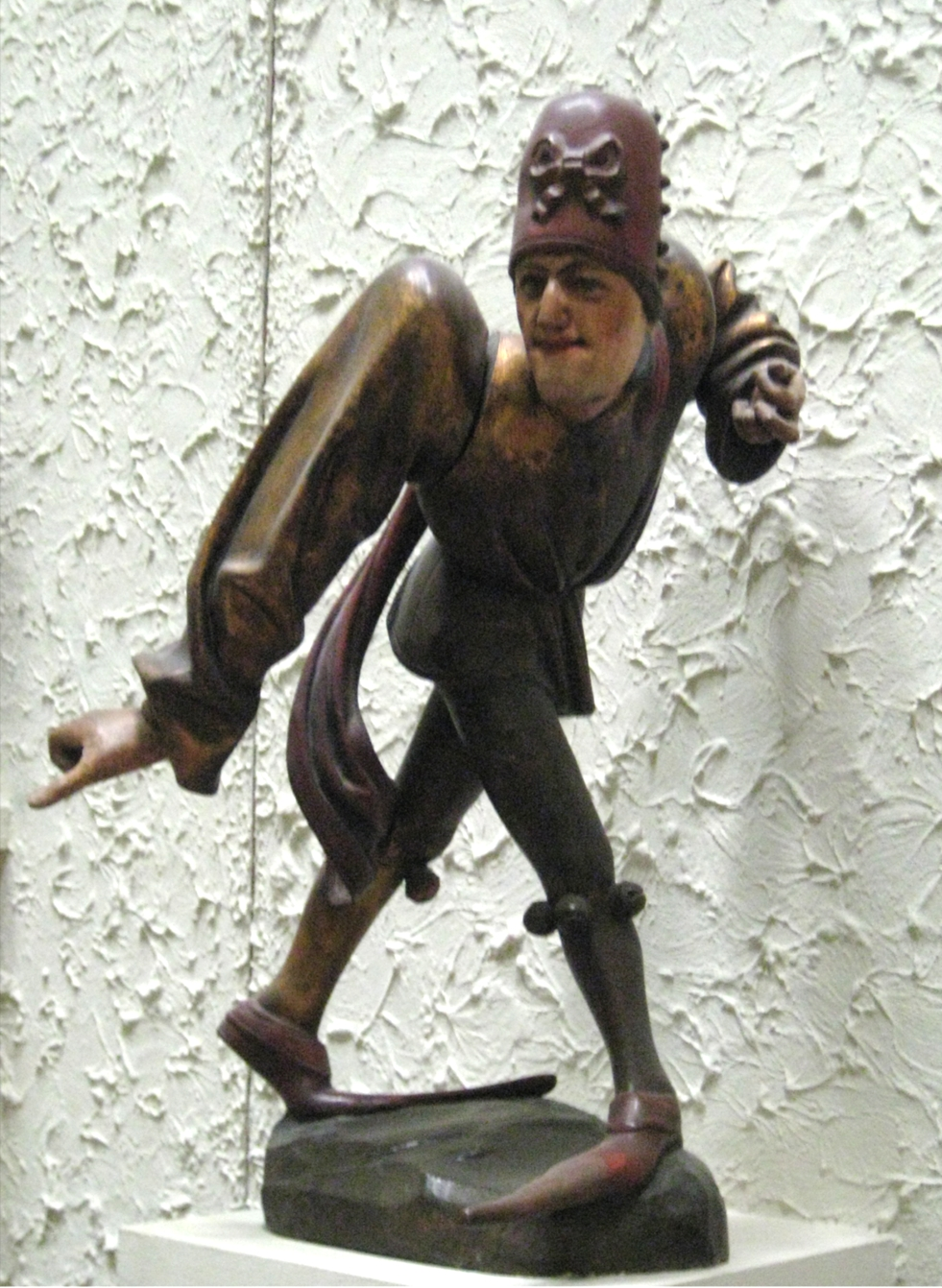
Moriskentänzer, one of 16 (now 10) Moresca Dancers by Erasmus Grasser, Munich Stadtmuseum, 1480.

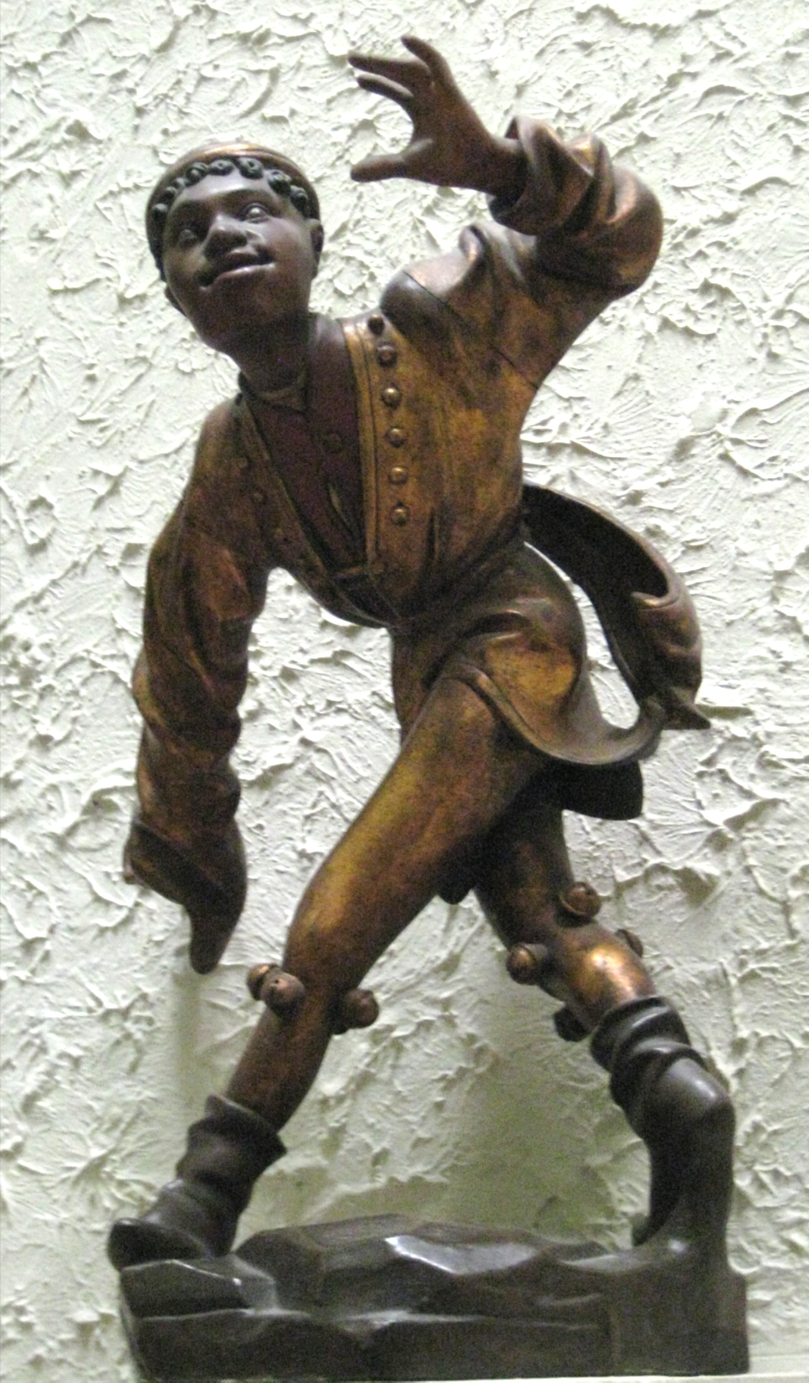
Moriskentänzer, one of 16 (now 10) Moresca Dancers by Erasmus Grasser, Munich Stadtmuseum, 1480.

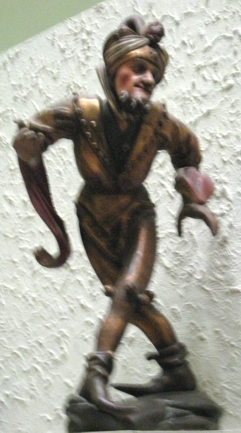
Moriskentänzer, one of 16 (now 10) Moresca Dancers by Erasmus Grasser, Munich Stadtmuseum, 1480.

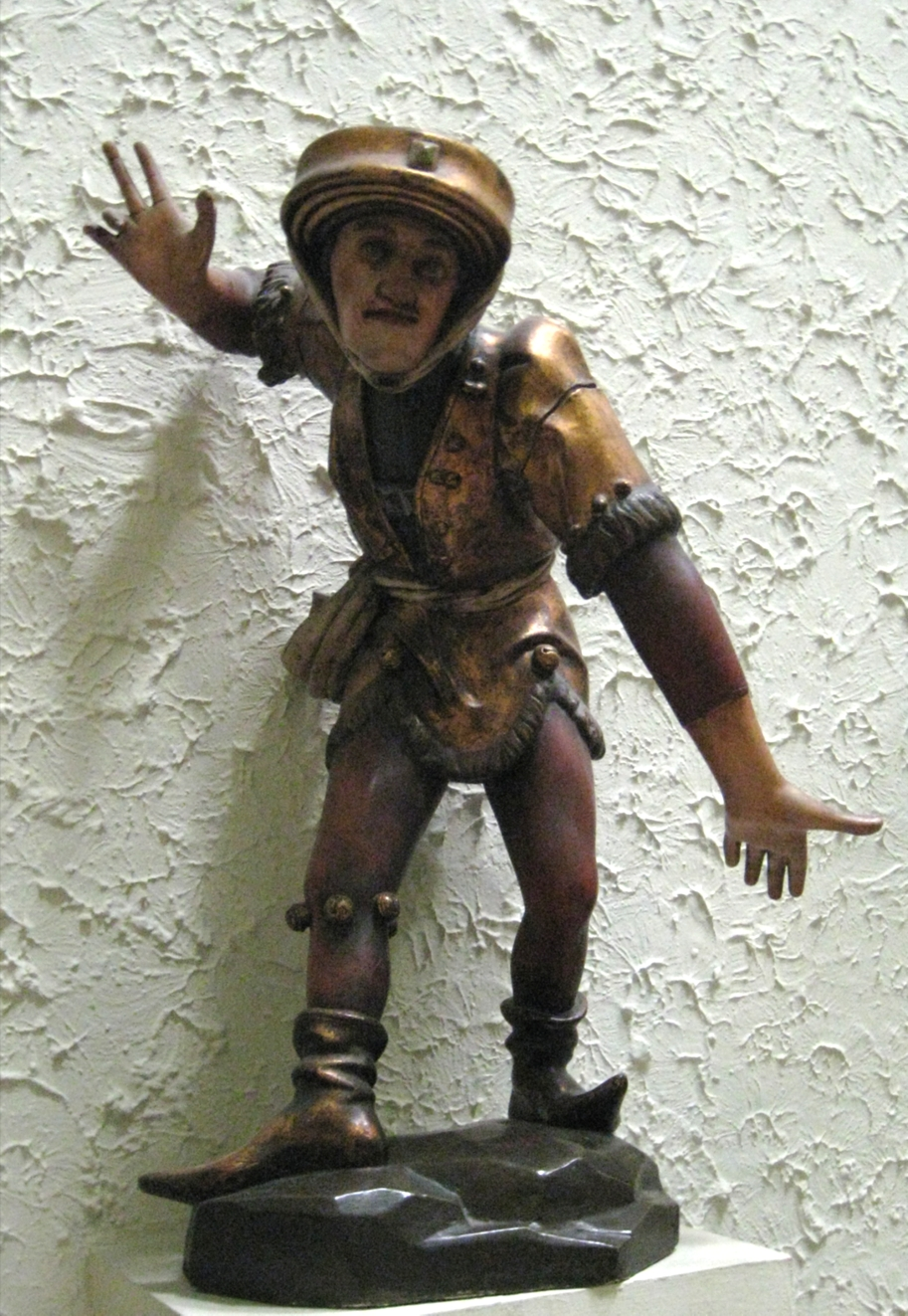
Moriskentänzer, one of 16 (now 10) Moresca Dancers by Erasmus Grasser, Munich Stadtmuseum, 1480.

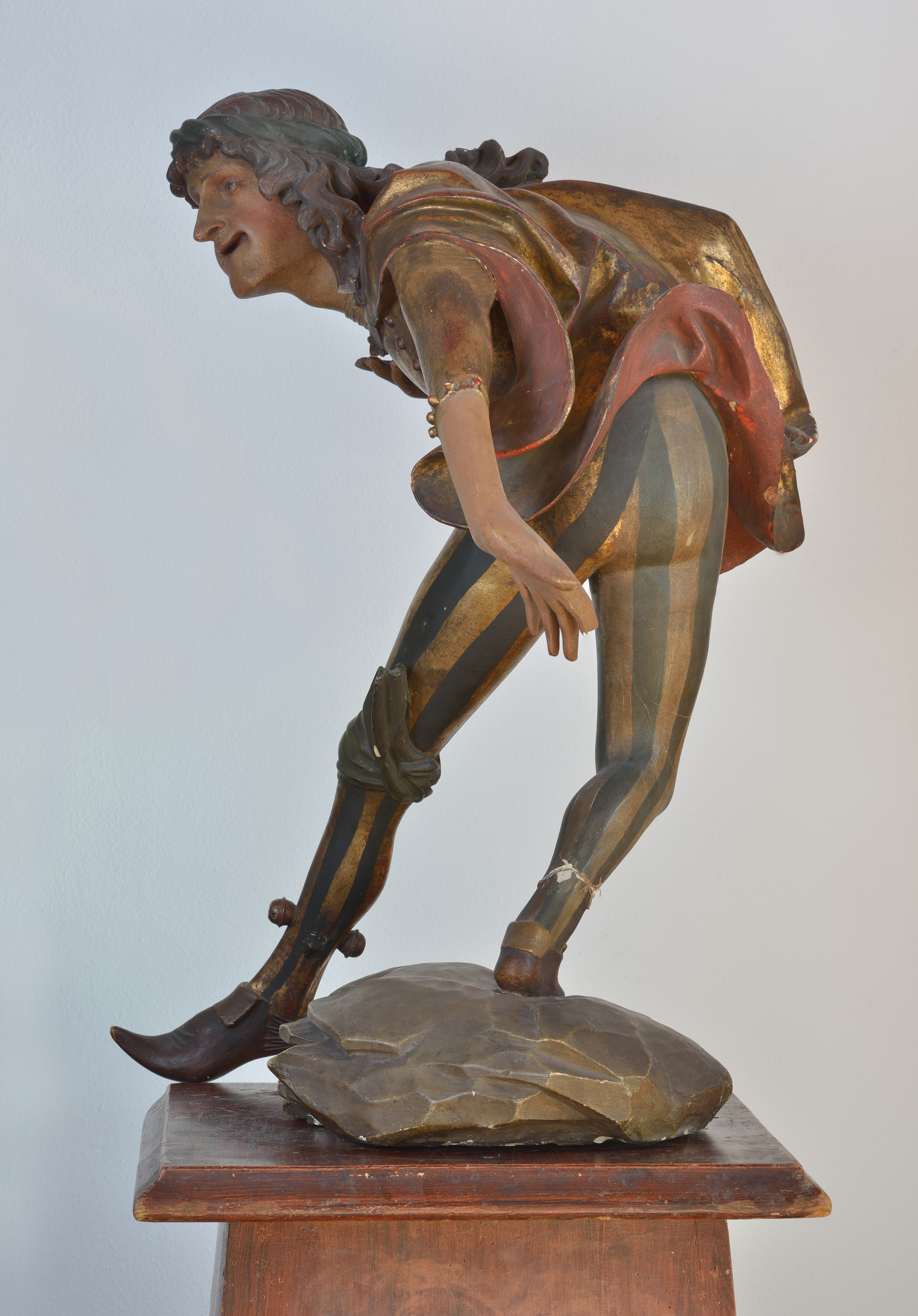

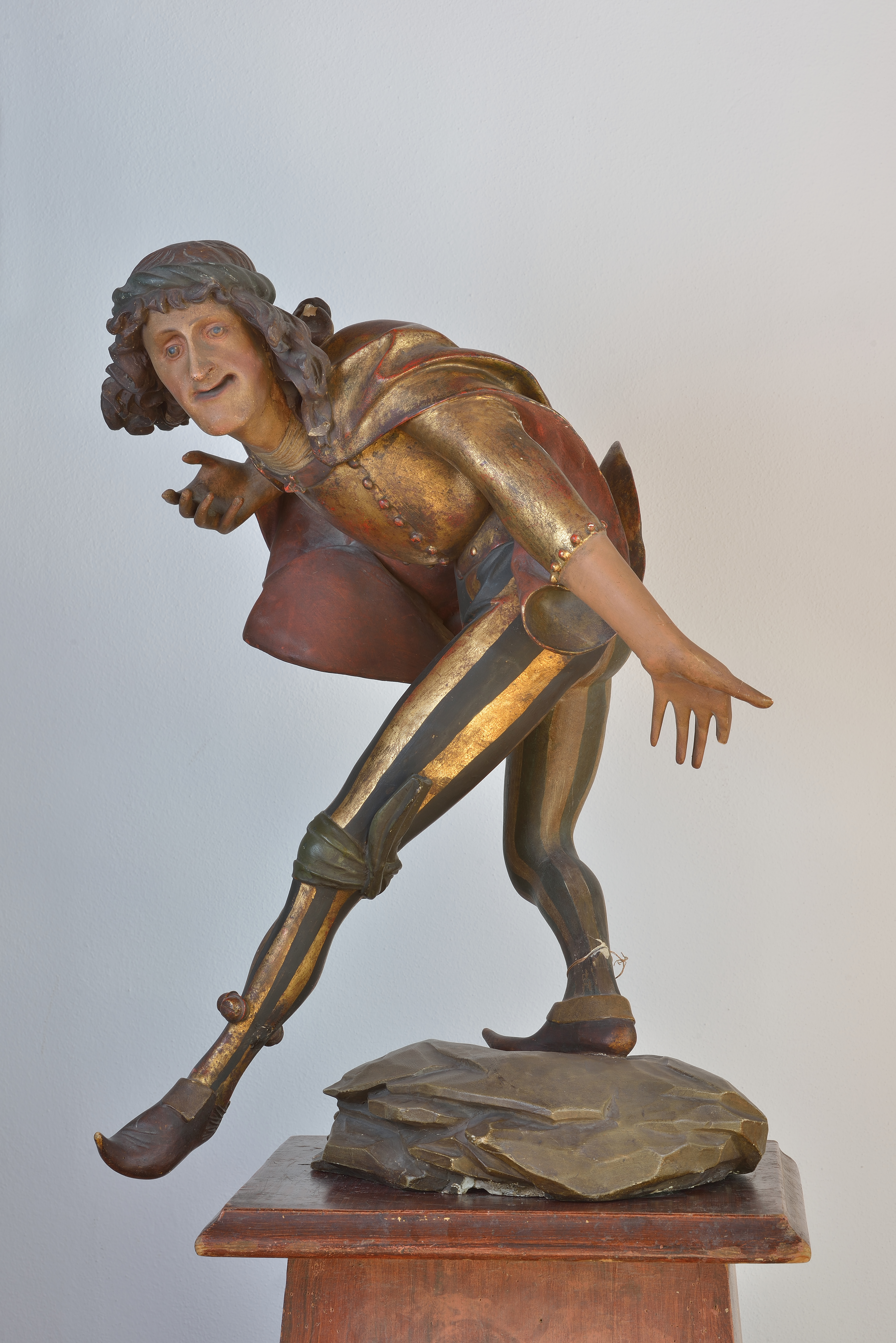
