= Ständlerstraße =

Street in Munich, Germany

The Ständlerstraße is a 3.5 km long street in the south of Munich. It is a part of the exterior ring planned in earlier years.

It runs from the Stadelheimer Straße, the corner of Schwanseestraße in Giesing, crosses the A8, is crossed by the chain bridge Neuperlach and ends in the Karl-Marx-Ring in Neuperlach. Due to the original planning, the routing of the road is also generous for eight lanes, but only built to four lanes. The street was named after a family of merchants known as Stantler, who for several generations practiced the craft of blade smith in the area

On it are the sculptures "Only Man is the Place of Images" by Jai Young Park and Pavilion - Slanted Walls by Kay Winkler, as well as the tram main workshop, which is now used by the MVG Museum and is a protected building. To the southwest is the cemetery at Perlacher Forst.

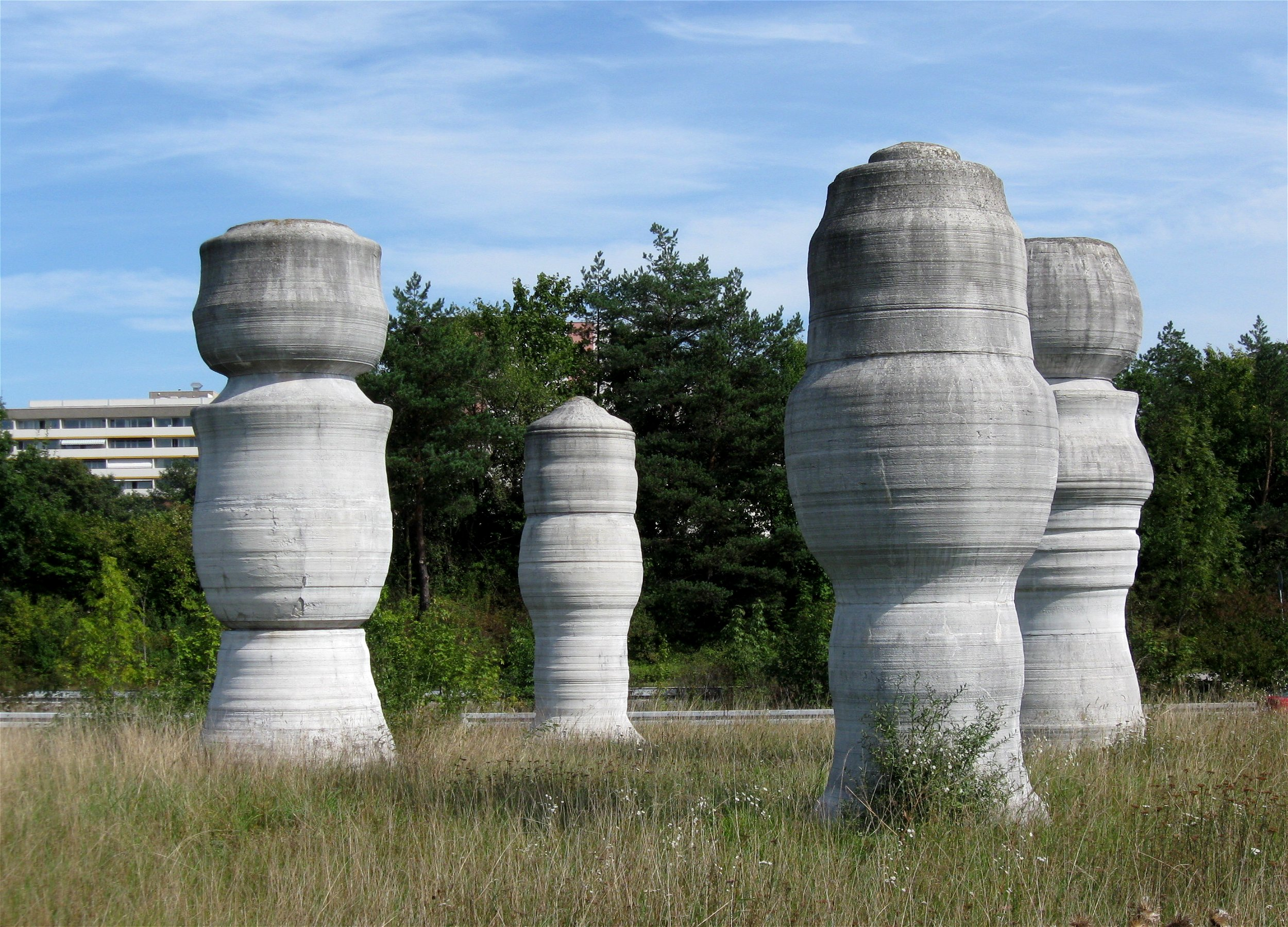
"Only man is the place of images"

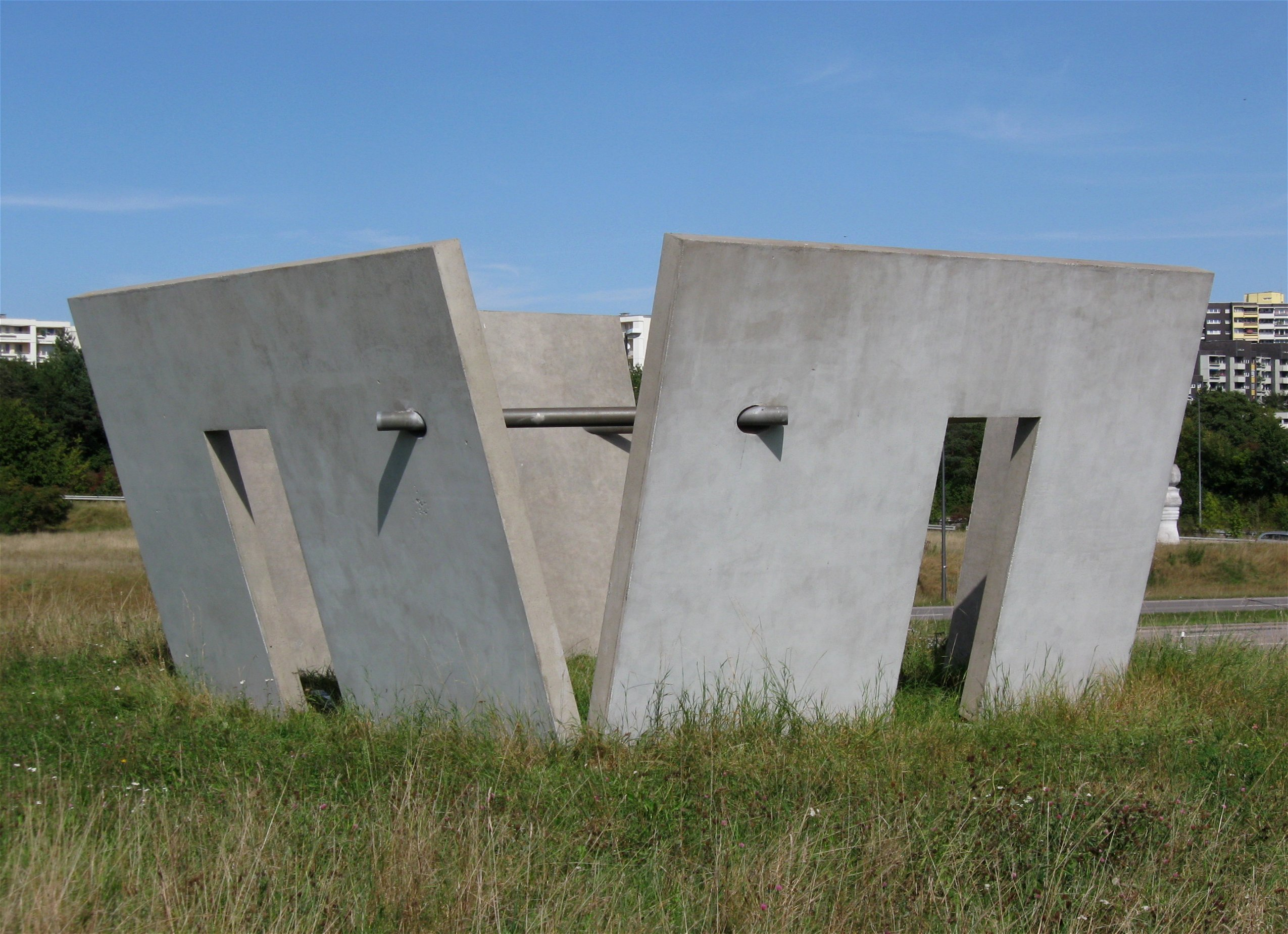
Pavilion - slanted walls

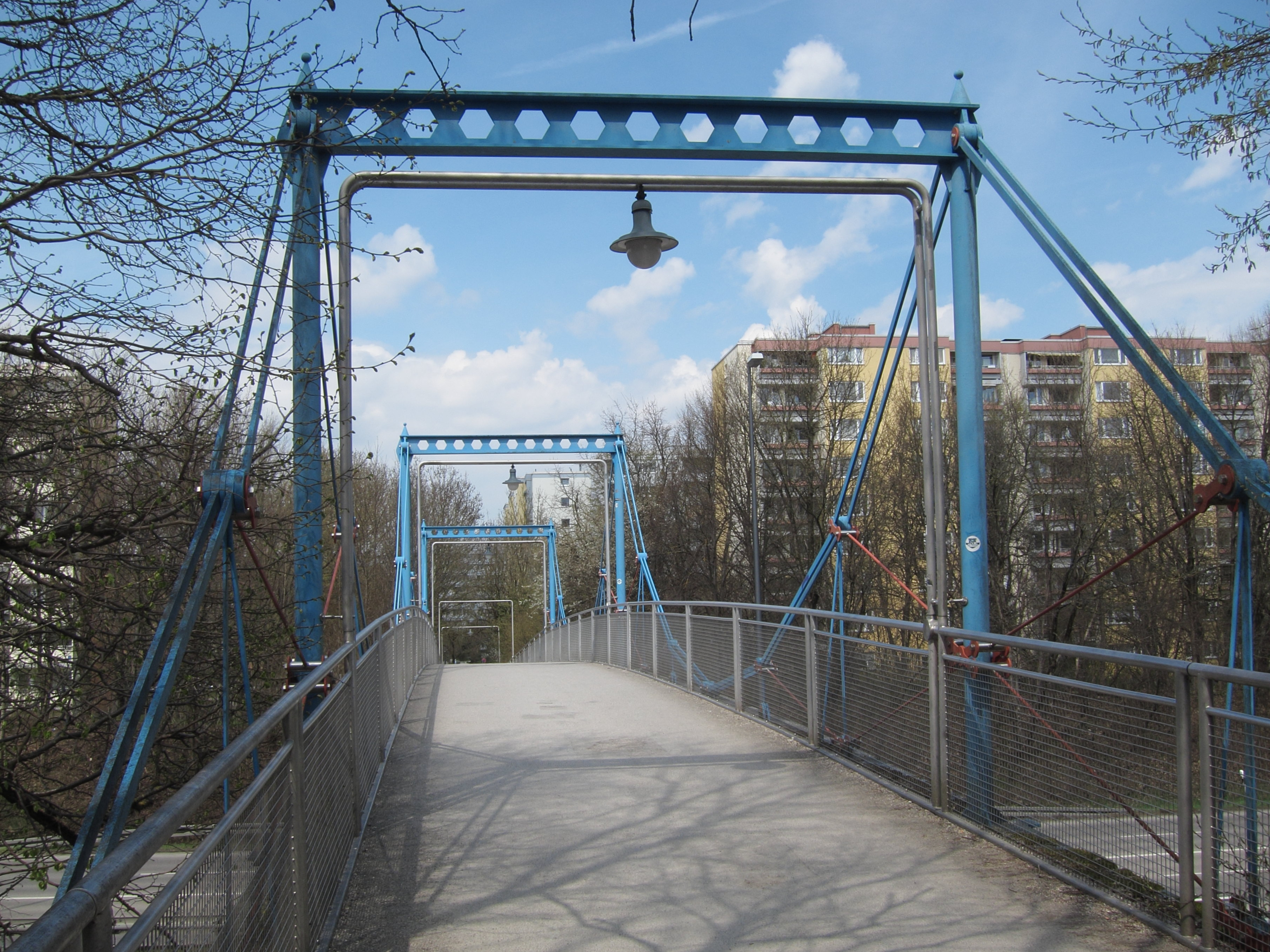
Chain Bridge Neuperlach

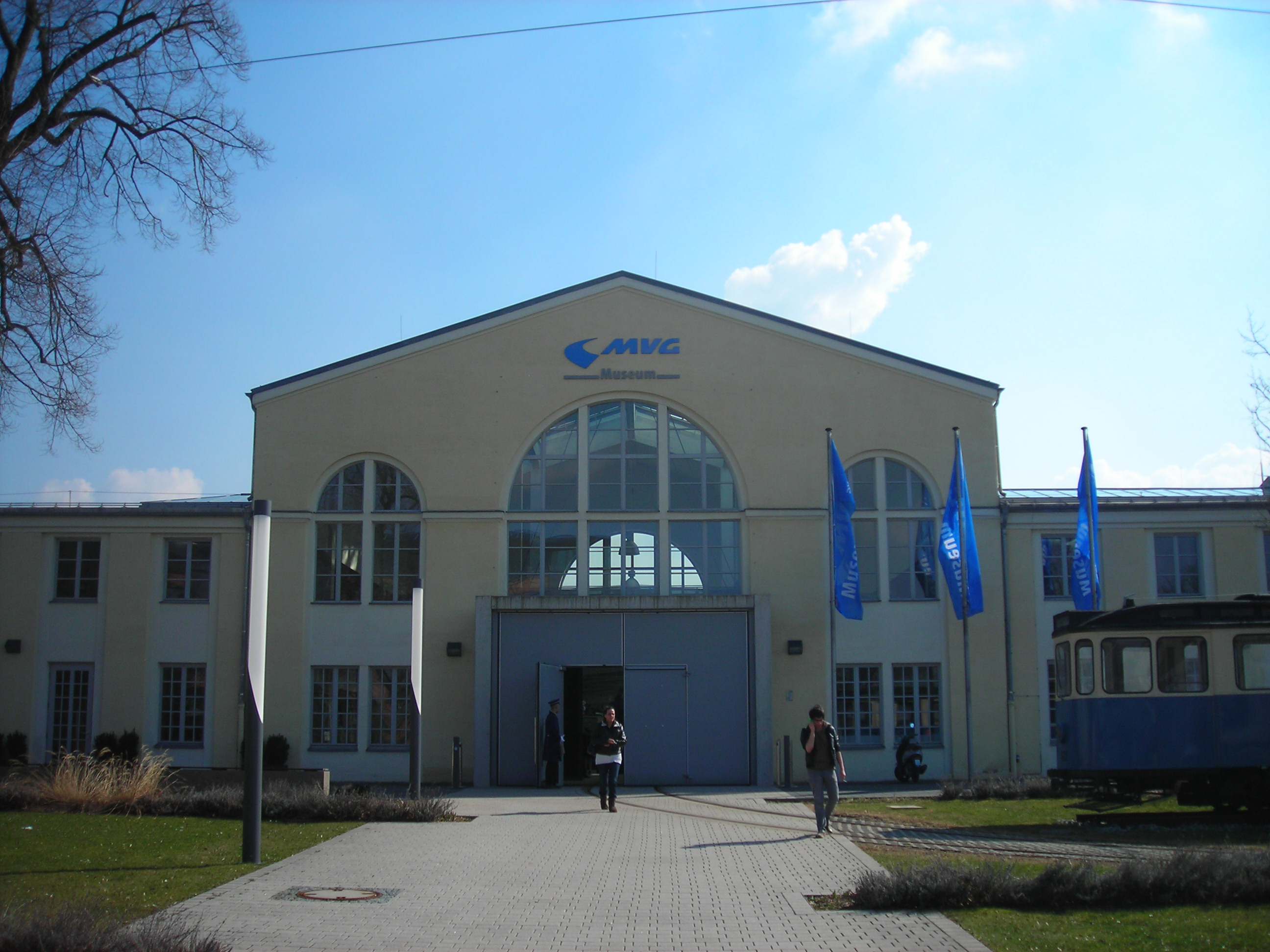
MVG Museum

For climate protection reasons, the street lamps were removed along the road in 2015.
