= Ostpark (Munich) =

Park in Munich, Germany

Coordinates: 48°06′49″N 11°38′17″E

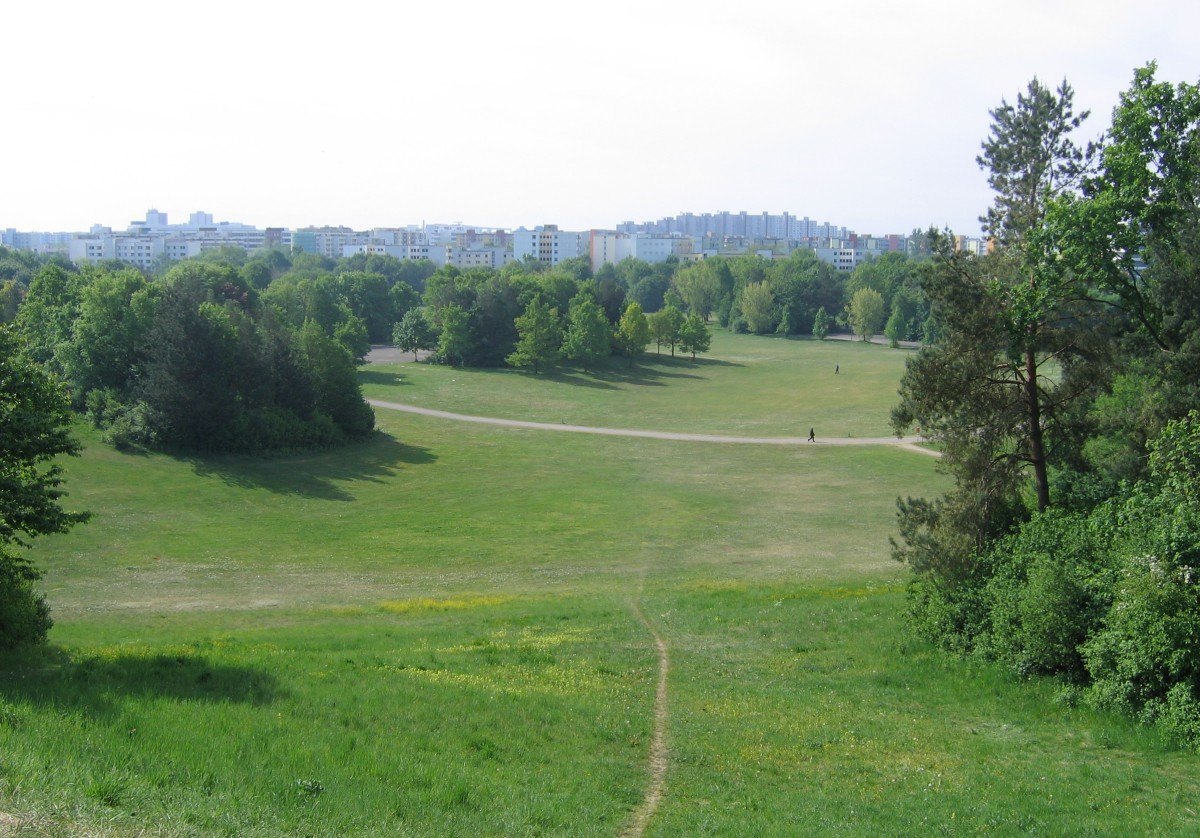

The Ostpark is a public park in Munich, Germany. It was planned since the 1960s and opened in 1973.

In June 2015 a renovated playground was opened in the Ostpark, close to the Michaeligarten beer garden. It has slides, swings, climbing facilities, a flying fox, an area for playing with water and sand and a wooden hut. It also has two tables with benches and a number of additional benches. The playground is accessible for children in wheelchairs.
