= Munich-Perlach station =

Railway station in Germany

München Perlach
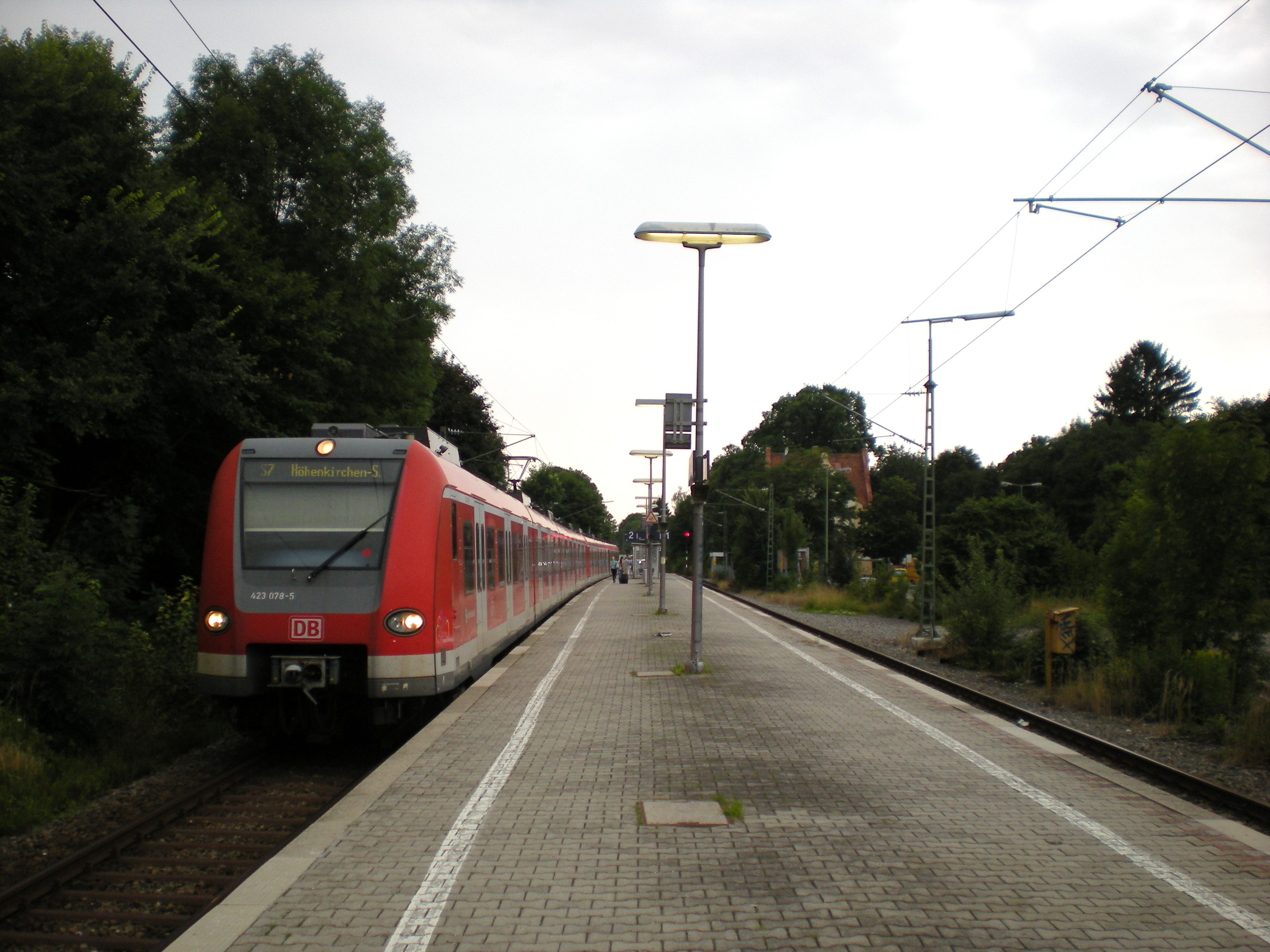
- 2012

General information
- Location: Stephensonplatz 1; 81737 Munich; Ramersdorf-Perlach; Bavaria; Germany
- Coordinates: 48.0937°N 11.6302°E
- Owner: Deutsche Bahn
- Operator: DB Netz; DB Station&Service
- Lines: Munich-Giesing–Kreuzstraße railway (KBS 999.7)
- Platforms: 1 island platform
- Tracks: 2
- Train operators: S-Bahn München
- Connections: 196

Construction
- Parking: yes
- Cycle facilities: yes
- Accessible: yes

Other information
- Station code: 4267
- DS100 code: MPER
- IBNR: 8004159
- Category: 5
- Fare zone: : M
- Website: www.bahnhof.de

History
- Opened: 6 June 1904; 122 years ago

Services
Preceding station	Munich S-Bahn	Following station
Giesing towards Weßling	S5	Neuperlach Süd towards Kreuzstraße
Location

Munich-Perlach station is a railway station in the Ramersdorf-Perlach borough of Munich, Germany.
