= Ottobrunn station =

Railway station in Germany

Ottobrunn
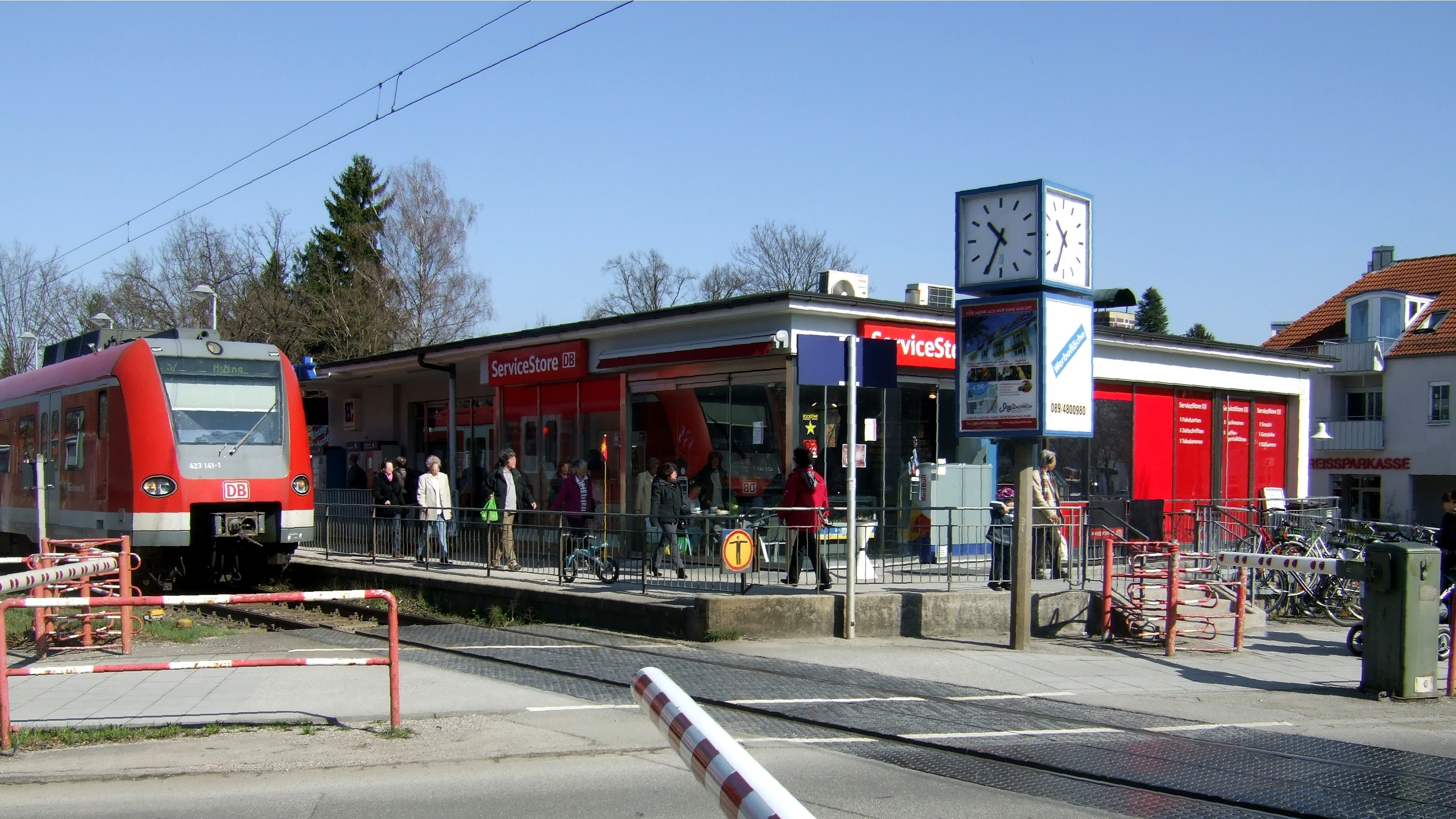
- 2010

General information
- Location: Ottobrunn, Bavaria; Germany
- Coordinates: 48°3′46.9″N 11°40′43.5″E
- Owner: DB Netz
- Operator: DB Station&Service
- Line: Munich–Kreuzstraße (14.7 km)
- Platforms: 1 side platform
- Tracks: 1
- Connections: 214, 221, 241

Other information
- Station code: n/a
- DS100 code: MOBR
- Category: 5
- Fare zone: : M and 1
- Website: www.bahnhof.de

Services
Preceding station	Munich S-Bahn	Following station
Neubiberg towards Weßling	S5	Hohenbrunn towards Kreuzstraße
Location
- Location within Bavaria Location within Germany Location within Europe

Ottobrunn is a station of the Munich S-Bahn. It is located in the south-eastern suburb of Ottobrunn. It is served by the line S5 in the direction of Kreuzstraße and Weßling in 20 minute intervals. The station consists of a station building and a platform, which services both in- and outbound trains. The station building hosts a bank and an art gallery. The station is not staffed, so tickets can only be bought at machines.
