= Munich-Giesing station =

Station of the Munich S-Bahn and U-Bahn

München Giesing
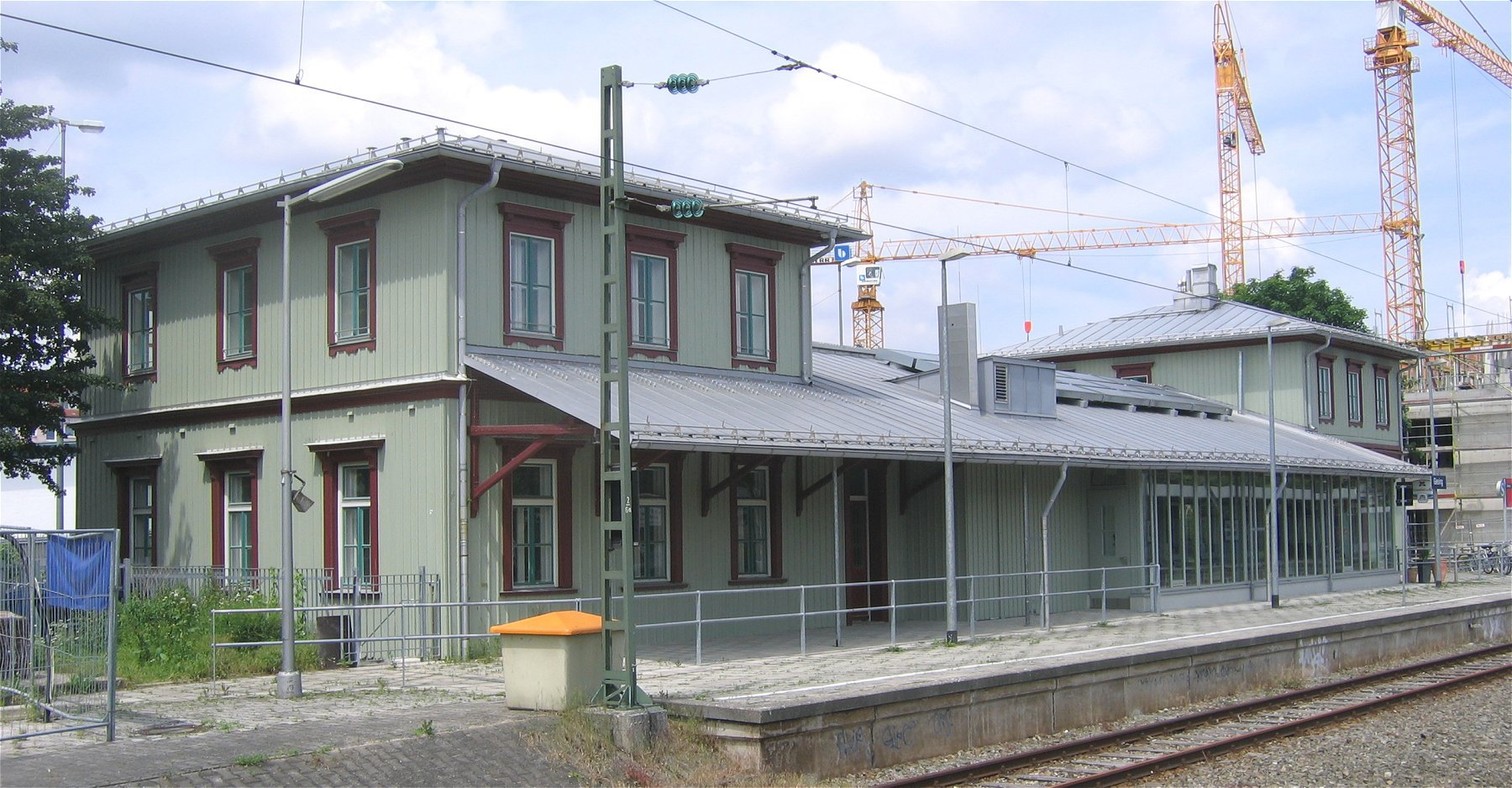
- Former station building seen from the tracks (2008)

General information
- Location: Giesinger Bahnhofplatz 1, Giesing, Munich, Bavaria; Germany
- Coordinates: 48°6′37″N 11°35′47″E
- Lines: Munich East–Deisenhofen (KBS 999.3); Munich-Giesing–Kreuzstraße (KBS 999.7)
- Platforms: 3
- Connections: E7; 139, 153, 220, N43, N44, O7

Construction
- Accessible: Yes

Other information
- Station code: 4255
- DS100 code: MGI
- IBNR: 8004148
- Category: 3
- Fare zone: : M
- Website: stationsdatenbank.de; www.bahnhof.de

History
- Opened: 10 October 1898; 127 years ago

Services
Preceding station	Munich S-Bahn	Following station
St.-Martin-Straße towards Mammendorf	S3	Fasangarten towards Holzkirchen
St.-Martin-Straße towards Weßling	S5	Perlach towards Kreuzstraße
Preceding station	Munich U-Bahn	Following station
Untersbergstraße towards Feldmoching	U2	Karl-Preis-Platz towards Messestadt Ost
Untersbergstraße towards Olympia-Einkaufszentrum	U7	Karl-Preis-Platz towards Neuperlach Zentrum
Untersbergstraße towards Olympiazentrum	U8	Karl-Preis-Platz towards Neuperlach Zentrum
Location

Munich-Giesing station (German: Bahnhof München-Giesing) is a railway station in the district of Obergiesing in the Bavarian state capital of Munich. It is also a station for the Munich S-Bahn and the Munich U-Bahn. It is located on the Munich East–Deisenhofen railway, the Munich-Giesing–Kreuzstraße railway, which branches off to the east from the Munich East–Deisenhofen line next to the Perlacher Forst cemetery, and the second trunk line of the Munich U-Bahn. The station is served by about 280 S-Bahn services each day.

== History ==
The Munich-Giesing station was built in 1898 on the newly built Munich East–Deisenhofen railway. At this time, it was a little more than a kilometre from the settlement of Giesing and was surrounded by meadows and fields. The former municipality of Giesing had already been incorporated into Munich since 1854. In 1904, a line via Perlach to Kreuzstraße was built; this used the existing line from Munich East station via Giesing station to the Perlacher Forst cemetery, where it branched off to the east.

A tram depot was built next to the station in 1912; this was used until 1972, when it was decommissioned and demolished. In the late 1920s and during the Nazi period, Giesing grew so that large blocks of flats were built in the area near the station and the fields and meadows along Deisenhofener Straße to central Giesing. In addition, the lines were electrified at this time. On 28 May 1972, the station was integrated into the Munich S-Bahn.

In 1985, the station building became one of Munich's last suburban railway stations to receive monument protection. Since 2004, it has been used as a district cultural centre named Giesinger Bahnhof and as the Gleiswirtschaft restaurant. On 18 October 1980, the second main line of the Munich U-Bahn was opened with the Giesing U-Bahn station under the S-Bahn station. The integrated bus terminal in front of the station was redesigned, and in the course of the reconstruction, was moved temporarily into the street next to the railway line. In mid-2009, a health centre and a retirement home were completed at Giesing station. Since 2010, the bus station has returned to the station forecourt.

== Infrastructure ==
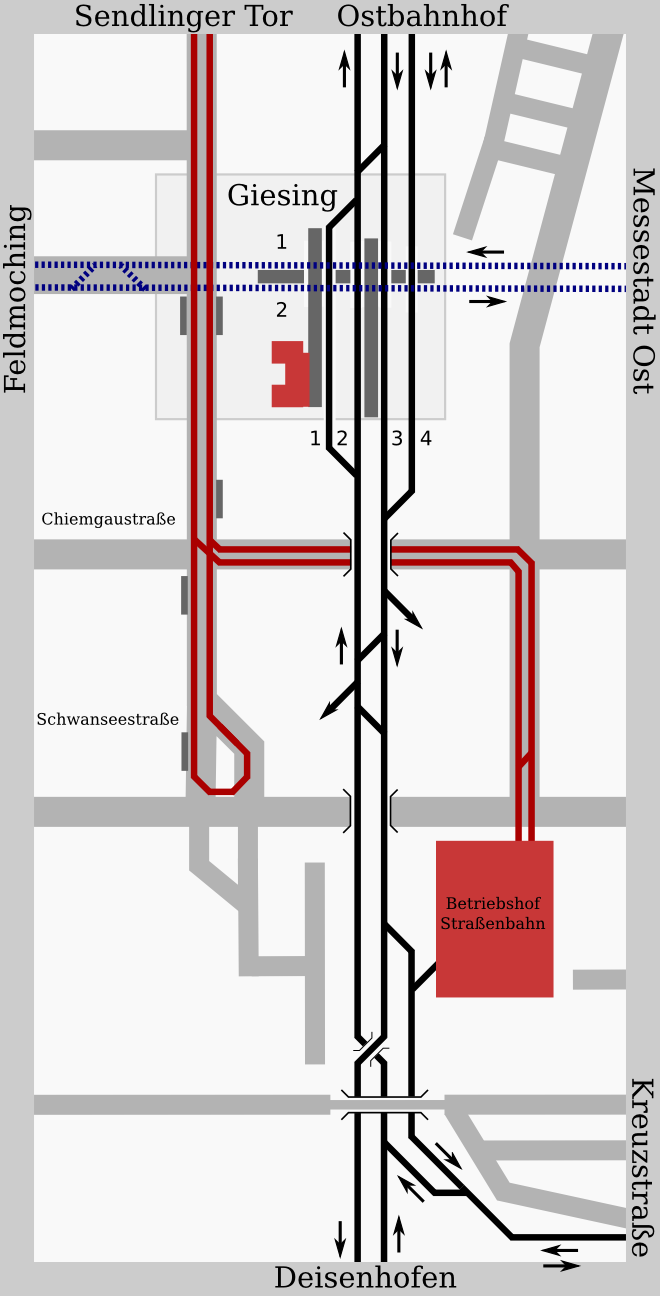
Track plan (2010)

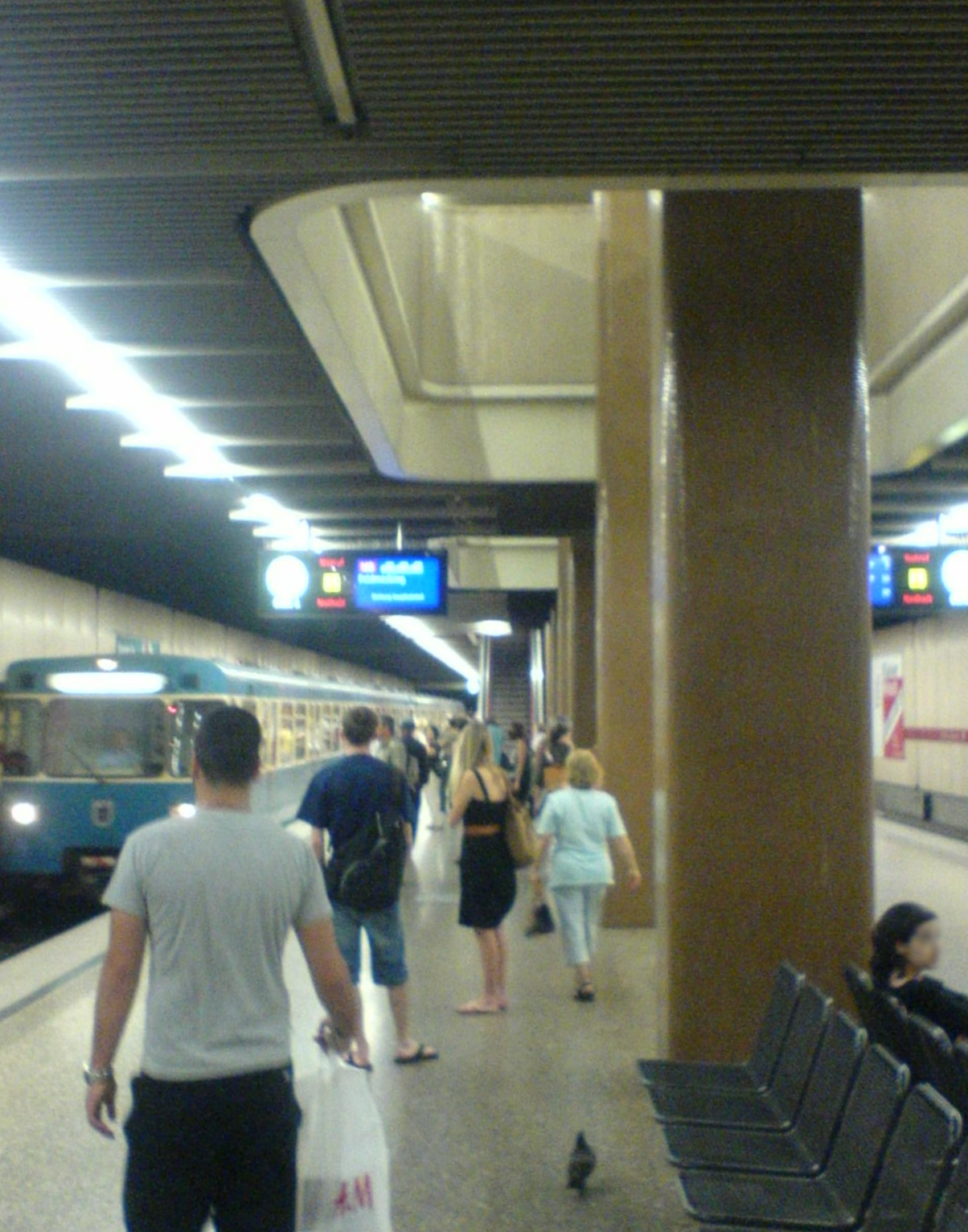
Platform

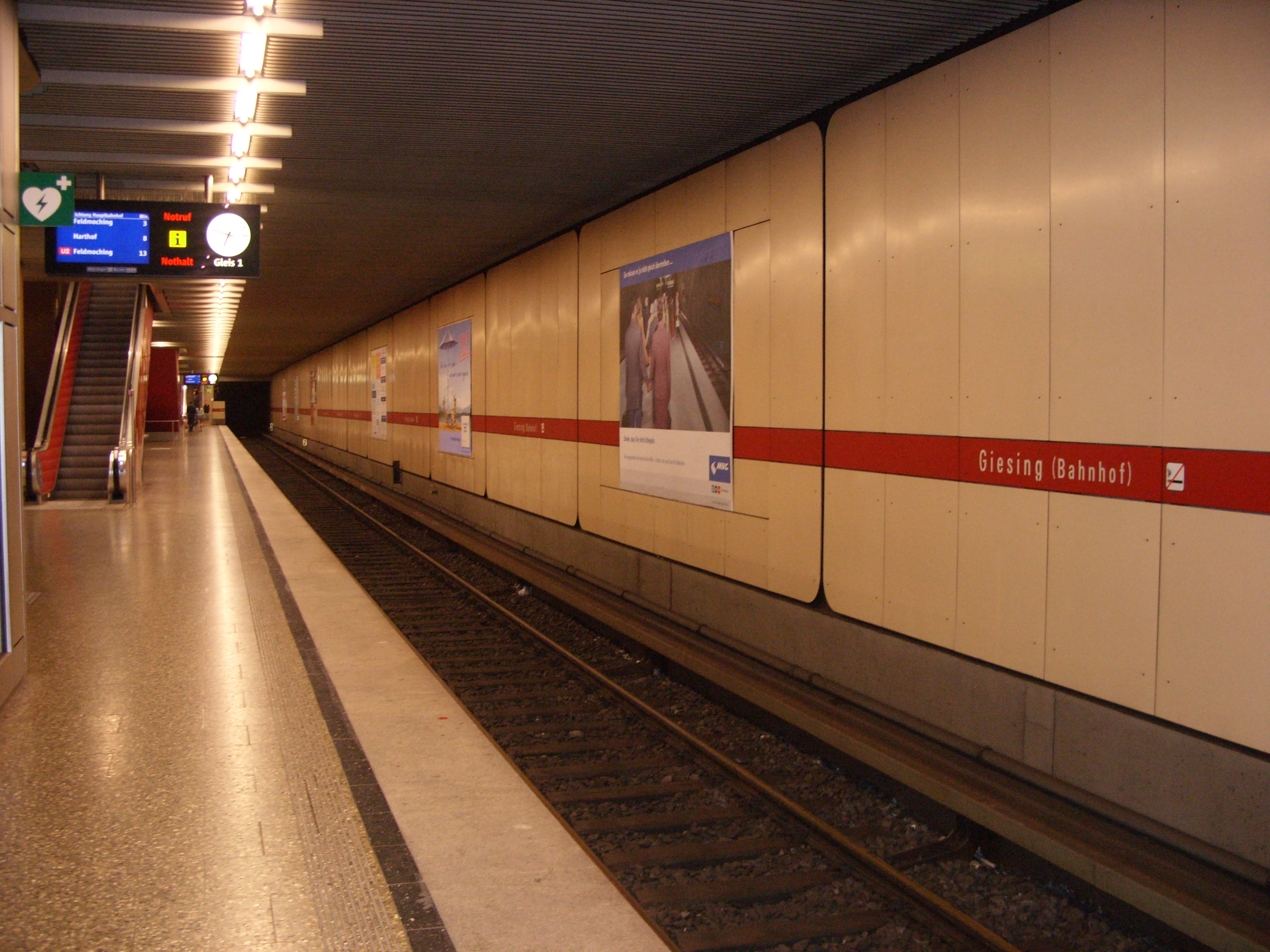
Giesing U-Bahn station

=== S-Bahn station ===
The S-Bahn station has four tracks, one of which has no platform and is used by through freight trains, and the S-Bahn uses two. The fourth track, which has a platform, serves as a siding. A special feature of the station is that the line between Munich East station (Ostbahnhof) and the junction at the Perlacher Forst cemetery has traffic running on the left, unlike almost all other Deutsche Bahn lines that run on the right. This is because the S-Bahn at Munich East station must reverse, and running on the left avoids a time-consuming crossing of the tracks there.

Platform information
Track	Length in m	Height in cm	Comments
1	211	76	Siding
2	211	76	S-Bahn services towards Munich East
3	211	76	S-Bahn services towards Holzkirchen and Kreuzstraße

=== U-Bahn station ===
The U-Bahn station is similar to all other underground stations opened in 1980 on line U 2, but unusually, there are openings in the platform ceilings to the mezzanine. The rear track walls are covered with large, vertically oriented wall panels, decorated in beige. The floor is covered with Isar gravel cast stones and equipped with two (formerly four) continuous streams of ceiling lights and is covered with aluminum leaf. There are stairs to the mezzanine at both ends and in the middle of the straight platform. The retrofitted lift connects the S-Bahn platform via the mezzanine directly to the U-Bahn platform. Another lift also leads from the mezzanine to the station forecourt. The mezzanine extends over the entire length of the U-Bahn station, which is somewhat unusual in Munich.

== Transport services ==
The station and the U-Bahn station, opened in 1980, form the central hub of public transport in Giesing. S-Bahn lines S 3 and S 5, U-Bahn lines U 2 and U 7, and MetroBus line 54 and tram line 17 meet at the station. Since 12 December 2011, the supplementary line U 7 services have run only in the morning peak hour. A bus station in front of the station serves Munich city bus lines 59, 139, and 147 as well as the regional bus route 220.
