= Munich-Neuperlach Süd station =

Station of the Munich S-Bahn and U-Bahn

Neuperlach Süd
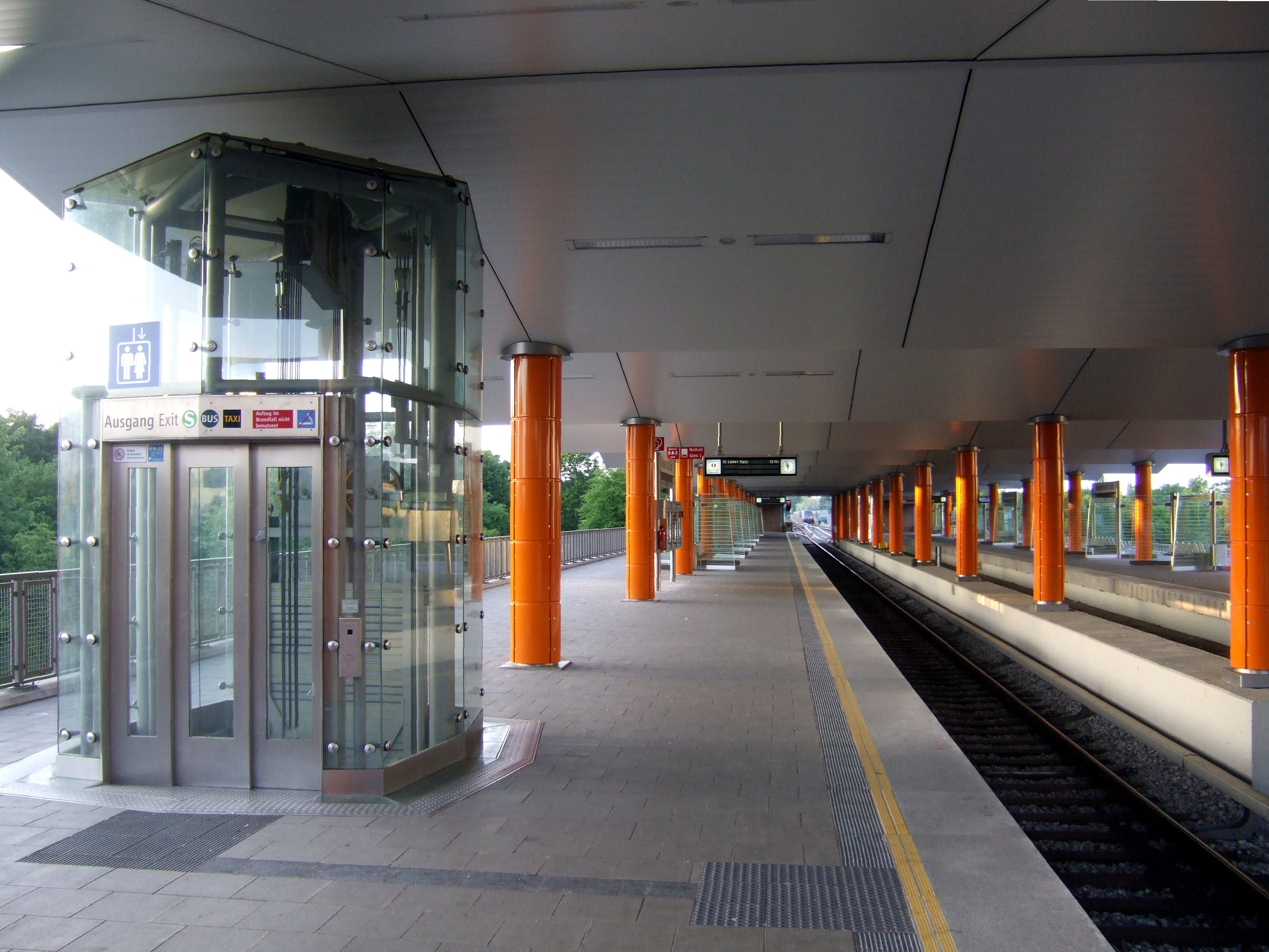

General information
- Location: Ramersdorf-Perlach, Munich, Bavaria; Germany
- Coordinates: 48°5′20″N 11°38′43″E
- Lines: Munich S-Bahn: Munich-Giesing–Kreuzstraße (5.0 km) (KBS 999.7)
- Platforms: S-Bahn: 1; U-Bahn: 2
- Connections: 195, 196, 199, 210, 211, 212, 217, 222, 229, 453, 455, 4900, N79

Construction
- Structure type: Elevated
- Accessible: Yes

Other information
- Station code: 4264
- DS100 code: MNPS
- Category: 5
- Fare zone: : M and 1
- Website: www.bahnhof.de

History
- Opened: 17 December 1977; 48 years ago

Services
Preceding station	Munich S-Bahn	Following station
Perlach towards Weßling	S5	Neubiberg towards Kreuzstraße
Preceding station	Munich U-Bahn	Following station
Therese-Giehse-Allee towards Laimer Platz	U5	Terminus
Location

Munich-Neuperlach Süd (south) is a railway station in Munich, the state capital of Bavaria, Germany. It is located in the Neuperlach area of the borough of Ramersdorf-Perlach. It serves as an transportation hub for the borough, providing interchange between S-Bahn, U-Bahn, and local bus services.

It is one of the six above-ground stations of the Munich U-Bahn network and the only above-ground station on line U 5. The U-Bahn station was opened on 18 October 1980. The S-Bahn station was opened on 17 December 1977. It has three platforms, two for the U-Bahn and one for the S-Bahn. It was served by line S7 until the end of 2024, when the new S5 replaced it. Track 1 has a side platform and is used by the U-Bahn services running into the city. Incoming U-Bahn services stop at track 2 on a central platform, which provides cross-platform interchange with the S-Bahn, which stops on track 3. The station is the terminus of U-Bahn line U 5 and is built on a bridge over Carl-Wery-Straße. The station was rebuilt from 2007 to 2009 and now has a new roof, displays and signs. At the end of the station there is a parking area for U-Bahn trains. It has two entrances one east of Carl-Wery-Straße and one to the west. The eastern exit leads to the Siemens ZFE (Central Research and Development) site, once the largest corporate research centre in Europe, employing roughly 14,000 at its peak in the early 1990s. The same exit leads to a parking lot. The west entrance leads to the bus terminal.

In the late 1980s, it was planned to extend the U 5 to the DASA premises in Ottobrunn. The project was not pursued.

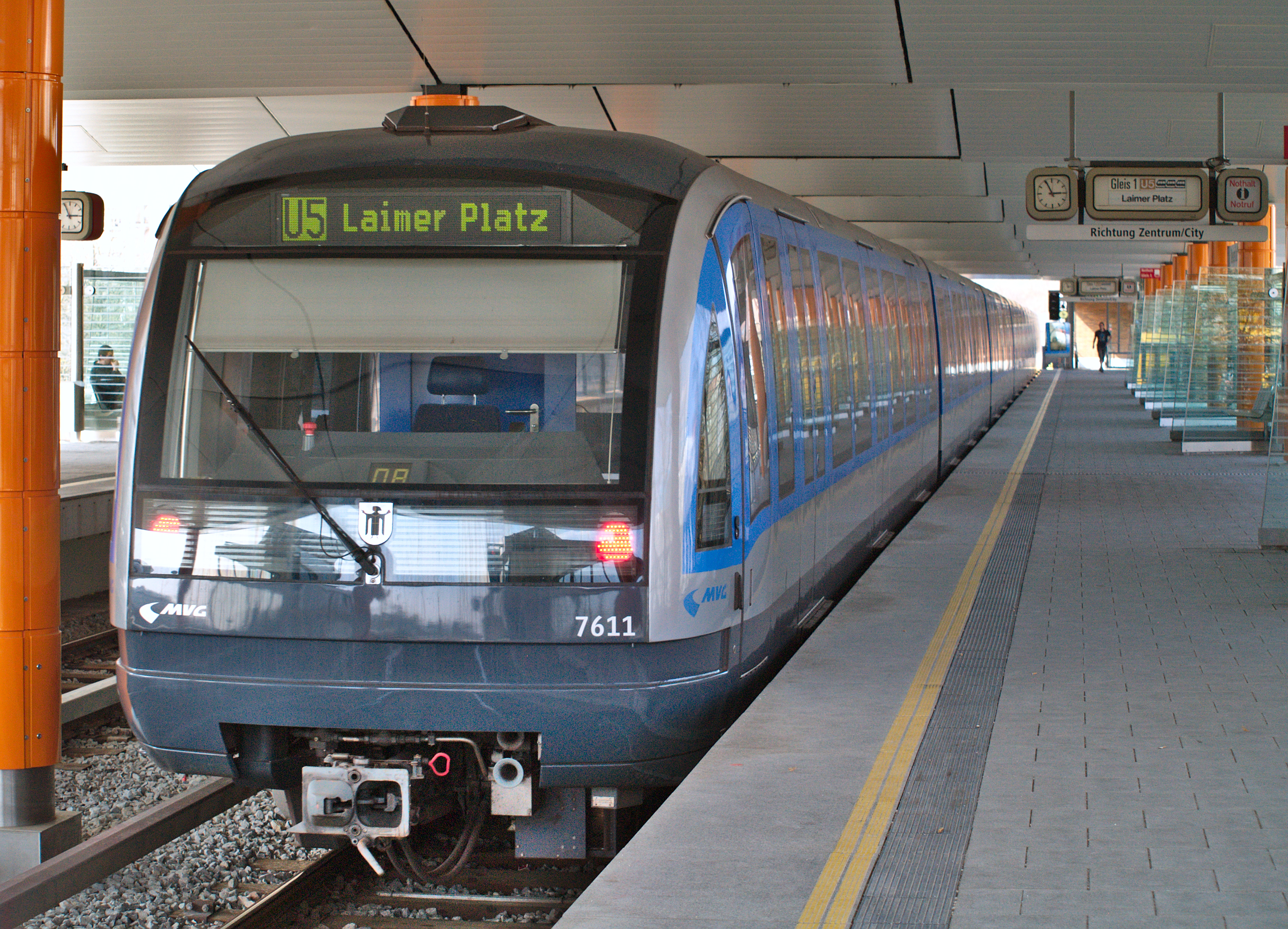
U-Bahn platform
