= Cornelia Doll =

German footballer (1958–2022)

Personal information
- Date of birth: 30 June 1958
- Date of death: 21 March 2022 (aged 63)
- Position: Defender

International career
Years	Team	Apps	(Gls)
1983–1984	Germany	4	(0)

Cornelia Doll (30 June 1958 – 21 March 2022) was a German footballer. She played in four matches for the Germany national team from 1983 to 1984.

== Career ==
=== Club ===
Born and raised in Giesing, Cornelia Doll was a defender at Bayern Munich from 1975 to 1985. During her club affiliation, she reached the final of the German championship four times with the team. On June 20, 1976, she reached the final with her team for the first time, after previously being defeated in Group 3 of the preliminary round after the return leg of VfL Schorndorf and the reigning German champions Bonner SC in the overall result. Tennis Borussia Berlin was held in the Leimbach Stadium in Siegen only defeated 4–2 after extra time after being 2–2 at the end of 60 minutes of regulation time.

On June 17 and 24, 1979, she played with Bayern Munich in the last two-leg final for the German championship, which was against SV Bergisch Gladbach 09, both in the municipal stadium on Grünwalder Strasse 2–3, and lost 1–0 at the An der Paffrather Straße stadium. In the first leg, she scored her only goal in her finals with the opening goal to make it 1–0 in the seventh minute.

Against SSG 09 Bergisch Gladbach she also reached her third final three years later with Bayern Munich. In the game on June 17, 1982 in the stadium on Paffrather Straße, her team was defeated 6–0.

She last reached the final with her team on June 30, 1985, which ended in the stadium on Westender Strasse in Duisburg with a goal by Anja Klinkowski in the 76th minute in favor of KBC Duisburg.

=== National team ===
Doll played four international matches for the DFB. First time on 24 September 1983 in Sønderborg in the 0–1 defeat of the senior national team in the qualifier for the first ever European Women's Championship in 1984 against the national team of Denmark. All three of their international matches, played in 1984, were lost: 2–1 against Italy (25 January in Milan), 1–4 against Norway (2 May in Helmstedt), and 2–0 against Belgium (on August 23 in Caorle).

== Trainer ==
From 1987 to 1991, Cornelia Doll succeeded Inge Mayerhofer as the coach at FC Bayern, most recently from 1990 also in the newly founded Bundesliga. She was then replaced by Peter König.

Cornelia Doll died at the age of 63 after a long illness.

== Achievements ==
- German Champion: 1976
- Championship runner-up: 1979, 1982, 1985
