= S3 (Munich) =

Line of the Munich S-Bahn

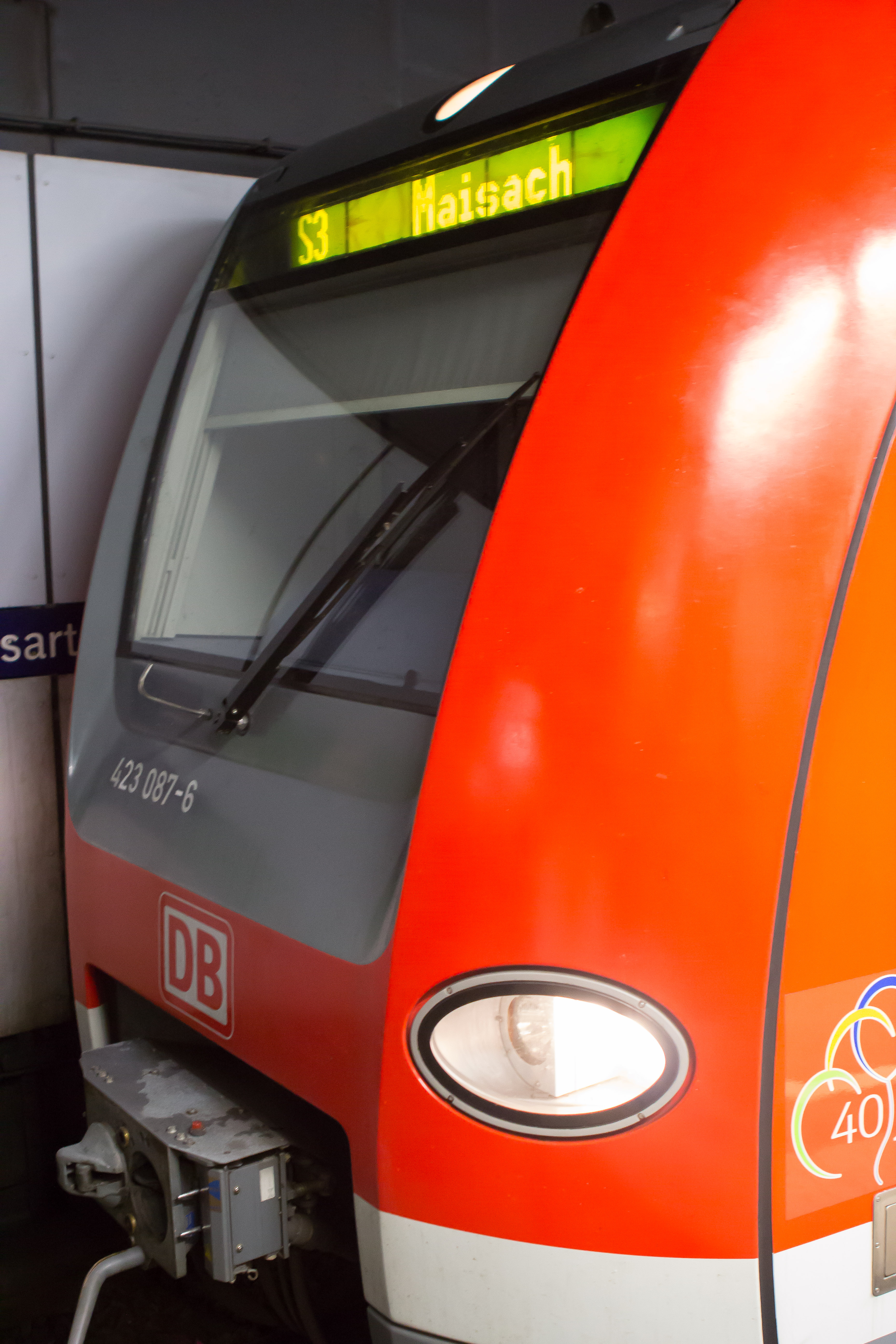

Overview
- Service type: Munich S-Bahn
- Locale: Munich, Bavaria, Germany
- Current operator(s): S-Bahn Munich

Technical
- Rolling stock: DBAG Class 423
- Electrification: 15 kV, 16.7 Hz AC Overhead lines
- Timetable number(s): 999.3

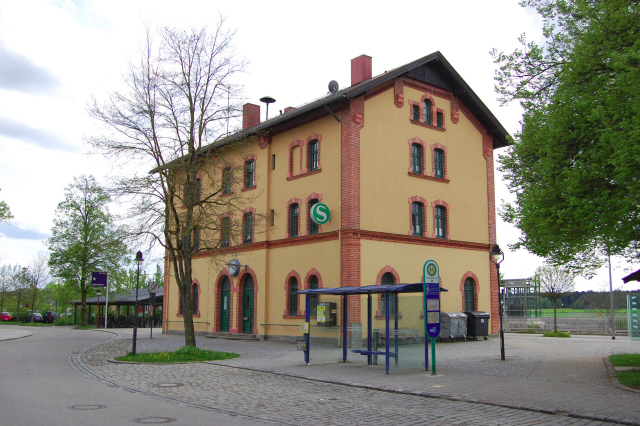
Deisenhofen station

The S3 is a service on the Munich S-Bahn network. It is operated by DB Regio Bayern. It runs from Mammendorf station to Holzkirchen station via Pasing, central Munich, Munich East, Giesing and Deisenhofen. Trains reverse in Munich East station and, in order for S-Bahn services from St Martinstraße to be inserted into the S-Bahn line while simultaneously reversing to run into the S-Bahn tunnel under central Munich or vice versa, the line between Munich East station and the flying junction between München-Giesing and Fasangarten stations is one of the few in Germany that has traffic running on the left.

The service is operated at 20-minute intervals between Maisach and Deisenhofen. Two out of three trains an hour continue from Maisach to Mammendorf and from Deisenhofen to Holzkirchen, so that the gap between trains alternates between 20 and 40 minutes. It is operated using class 423 four-car electrical multiple units, usually as two coupled sets. In the evenings and on Sundays they generally run as single sets.

The service uses several railway lines built at various times:

- from Mammendorf to Pasing over the Munich–Augsburg railway, opened by the Munich–Augsburg Railway Company from Munich to Lochhausen on 1 September 1839, from Lochhausen to Olching on 27 October 1839, from Olching to Maisach on 7 December 1839 and from Maisach to Mammendorf on 4 October 1840
- from Pasing to the approaches to Munich Central Station (Hauptbahnhof) over a section of the S-Bahn trunk line laid parallel to the Munich–Augsburg railway
- the underground section of the S-Bahn trunk line from the approaches to Munich Central Station to Munich East station, opened on 1 May 1971
- from Munich East station to Deisenhofen on the Munich East–Deisenhofen railway, opened by the Royal Bavarian State Railways on 10 October 1898 and electrified in March 1971.
- from Deisenhofen to Holzkirchen over the Munich–Holzkirchen railway, opened on 31 October 1857 and electrified in 1968.

The S3 was introduced on 28 May 1972 and ran between Mammendorf (then called Nannhofen) and Ismaning. At the same the S2 began operating between Petershausen and Deisenhofen. This service was extended to Holzkirchen in 1975. Since December 2009 the S3 runs between Mammendorf and Holzkirchen.
