= Munich St.-Martin-Straße station =

Railway station in Germany

München St.-Martin-Straße
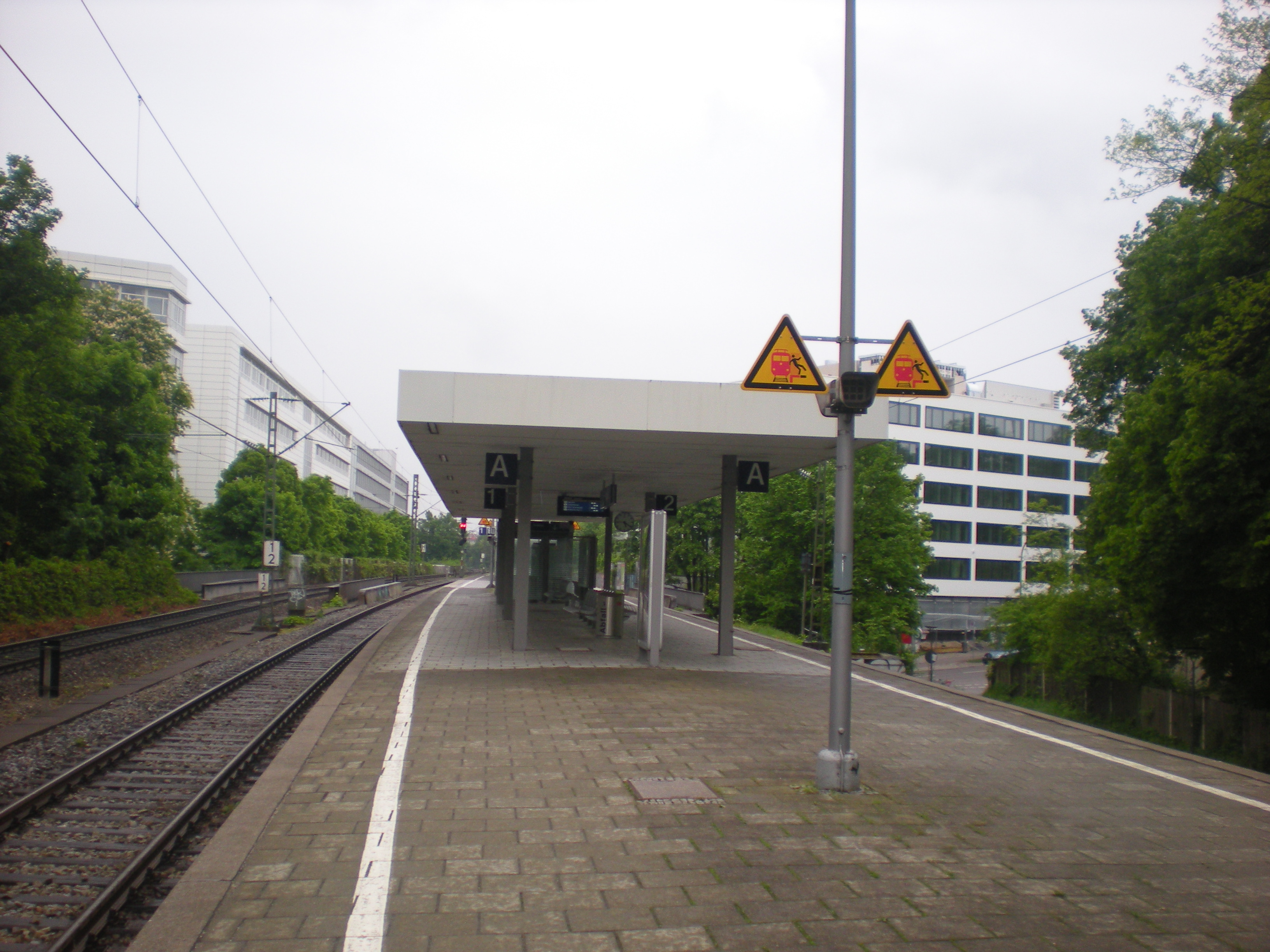

General information
- Location: Munich, Bavaria; Germany
- Coordinates: 48°07′07″N 11°35′45″E
- Lines: Munich East–Deisenhofen (KBS 999.3)
- Platforms: 2

Other information
- Station code: n/a
- DS100 code: MMAR
- Category: 5
- Fare zone: : M
- Website: www.bahnhof.de

Services
Preceding station	Munich S-Bahn	Following station
Munich East towards Mammendorf	S3	Giesing towards Holzkirchen
Munich East towards Weßling	S5	Giesing towards Kreuzstraße
Location

Munich St.-Martin-Straße station is a railway station in Munich, Germany, spanning the street bearing the same name. It is on the Munich East–Deisenhofen railway and is served by lines S 3 and S 5 of the Munich S-Bahn. It is in close proximity to the southwest Europe headquarters of Nokia Siemens Networks in Munich.
