= Munich East station =

Munich railway station

München Ost
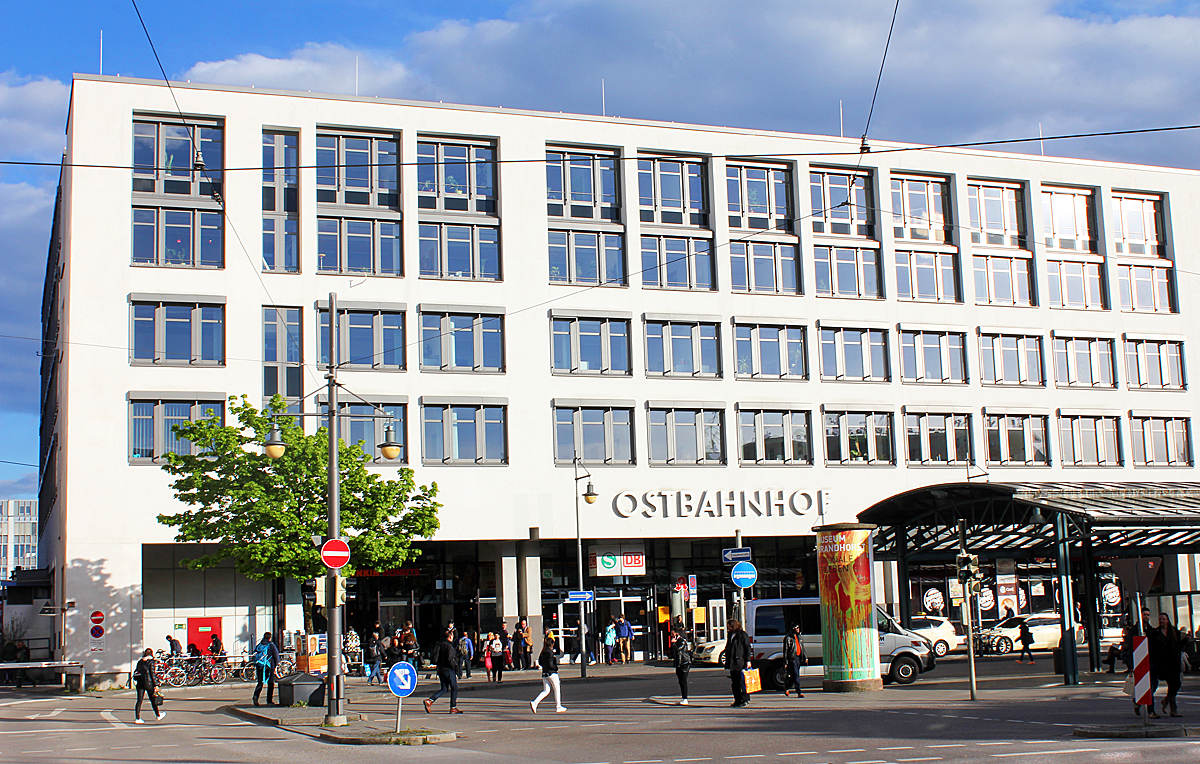
- Entrance building on Orleansplatz

General information
- Location: Orleansplatz 11, Haidhausen, Munich, Bavaria; Germany
- Coordinates: 48°07′37″N 11°36′17″E
- Lines: Long distance/regional: München–Mühldorf (KBS 940 / 999.2); München–Rosenheim (KBS 950 / 951 / 999.4); S-Bahn: S-Bahn trunk line (S1–S8) (KBS 999); Munich Ost–Deisenhofen railway (S3, S5) (KBS 999.3); Munich–Munich Airport (S8) (KBS 999.8)
- Platforms: 6 island platforms
- Tracks: 14
- Connections: E7; 100, 145, 149, 155, 190, 191, N43, N44, N45, N74, N75

Construction
- Accessible: Yes

Other information
- Station code: 4241
- DS100 code: MOP
- IBNR: 8000262
- Category: 1
- Fare zone: : M
- Website: stationsdatenbank.de; www.bahnhof.de

History
- Opened: 1 May 1871; 155 years ago
Services
Preceding station	DB Fernverkehr	Following station
München Hbf towards Berlin Gesundbrunnen	ICE 11	Rosenheim towards Innsbruck Hbf
München Hbf towards Frankfurt (Main) Hbf or Münster Hbf	ICE 62	Rosenheim towards Graz Hbf
München Hbf towards München Hbf	EC 62	Rosenheim towards Salzburg Hbf or Vienna Airport
München Hbf Terminus	EC 89	Rosenheim towards Venezia Santa Lucia
München Hbf towards Frankfurt (Main) Hbf	ICE 89	Rosenheim towards Feldkirch
Preceding station	ÖBB	Following station
München Hbf Terminus	Railjet	Rosenheim towards Klagenfurt Hbf
München Hbf Terminus	Railjet	Rosenheim towards Salzburg Hbf
München Hbf Terminus	Nightjet	Rosenheim towards Roma Termini or La Spezia Centrale
Preceding station	EuroCity	Following station
München Hbf Terminus	EuroCity	Rosenheim towards Bologna Centrale
München Hbf Terminus	EuroCity	Rosenheim towards Rimini
München Hbf Terminus	EuroCity	Rosenheim towards Verona Porta Nuova
München Hbf towards Frankfurt (Main) Hbf	EuroCity	Rosenheim towards Klagenfurt Hbf
München Hbf towards Frankfurt (Main) Hbf	EuroCity	Rosenheim towards Zagreb Glavni kolodvor
München Hbf Terminus	EuroCity	Rosenheim towards Innsbruck Hbf
Preceding station		Following station
München Hbf Terminus	RE 4 Limited service	Dorfen Bahnhof towards Simbach (Inn)
München Hbf Terminus	RB 40	Markt Schwaben towards Mühldorf (Oberbay)
München Hbf Terminus	RB 48	Grafing Bahnhof towards Wasserburg (Inn)
Preceding station		Following station
München Hbf Terminus	RE 5	Rosenheim towards Salzburg Hbf
München Hbf Terminus	RB 54	Grafing Bahnhof towards Kufstein
Preceding station	Munich S-Bahn	Following station
Rosenheimer Platz towards Freising or Flughafen	S1	Leuchtenbergring Terminus
Rosenheimer Platz towards Petershausen or Altomünster	S2	Leuchtenbergring towards Erding
Rosenheimer Platz towards Mammendorf	S3	Reverses direction
St.-Martin-Straße towards Holzkirchen	S3	Reverses direction
Rosenheimer Platz towards Geltendorf	S4	Leuchtenbergring towards Ebersberg
Rosenheimer Platz towards Weßling	S5	Reverses direction
St.-Martin-Straße towards Kreuzstraße	S5	Reverses direction
Rosenheimer Platz towards Tutzing	S6	Leuchtenbergring towards Ebersberg
Rosenheimer Platz towards Herrsching	S8	Leuchtenbergring towards Flughafen
Preceding station	Munich U-Bahn	Following station
Max-Weber-Platz towards Laimer Platz	U5	Innsbrucker Ring towards Neuperlach Süd
Preceding station	Croatian Railways	Following station
München Hbf towards Stuttgart Hbf	EuroNight	Rosenheim towards Zagreb
Preceding station	PKP Intercity	Following station
München Hbf Terminus	EuroNight	Rosenheim towards Warszawa Wschodnia
Location

Munich East station (German: Bahnhof München Ost, also called München Ostbahnhof in regional services) is a major railway station in Munich, the capital of Bavaria, Germany. The station opened in 1871 as Haidhausen station on the Munich–Mühldorf and Munich–Rosenheim railway lines.

DB Station&Service, a subsidiary of Deutsche Bahn AG, operates the station. It is classified as a Category 1 station, one of 21 in Germany and one of two in Munich (the other is München Hauptbahnhof).

Munich East is the city's third interregional station, along with München Hauptbahnhof in the city centre and München-Pasing in the west.

== History ==
The first station, built according to plans designed by Friedrich Bürklein, was inaugurated on 1 May 1871 as part of the newly built railway line to Neuötting via Mühldorf am Inn. The line to Rosenheim opened on 15 October 1871. It was initially named Haidhausen after the eponymous quarter, but it received its present name München Ost on 15 October 1876. The station was given additional significance as a railway hub with the opening of the Munich East–Deisenhofen line in 1898; followed by train connections to Ismaning and Schwabing in 1909, the first to be electrified in 1927.

The station was severely damaged by the bombing of Munich on 24/25 April 1944 and had to be entirely rebuilt after World War II. A provisional counter hall was erected in 1952. A motorail (Autoreisezug) yard opened on 22 June 1959.

In May 1972, shortly before the Summer Olympics, Munich East became part of the Munich S-Bahn network as the eastern terminus of the Stammstrecke to Munich Pasing in the west. The present-day entrance building was erected in 1985. Three years later, in 1988, the station also received access to the Munich U-Bahn network. Further refurbishments of the station building took place in 1999 and in 2008.

== Operational usage ==
=== Track assignments ===
Munich East station has 17 tracks. The tracks are used as follows:

- Tracks 1–5: S-Bahn (suburban trains)
- Tracks 6–8 and 11–14: Regional and interregional trains
- Tracks 9, 10, 15: Through tracks
- Tracks 16 and 17: Motorail services (trains that carry vehicles)

=== Long-distance services ===
Long-distance trains at Munich East include InterCity, EuroCity, and Railjet services. These trains travel via Rosenheim to Salzburg, Innsbruck, Italy, and Southeastern Europe. Some InterCityExpress (ICE) trains to Vienna and Innsbruck also stop at the station.

=== Regional services ===
Regional-Express and Regionalbahn trains connect Munich East with the Chiemgau region and southeastern Bavaria. These services are operated by SüdostBayernBahn (a subsidiary of Deutsche Bahn AG) and Bayerische Regiobahn (a private company).

=== S-Bahn ===
The S-Bahn section of Munich East, called Ostbahnhof, was modernized during the Takt 10 project. All S-Bahn lines except S20 stop at the station.

- Lines S2, S4, S6 and S8 continue east from platform 5.
- Lines S3 and S7 reverse at platform 4 and continue south to Giesing.
- Trains to the city tunnel depart from platforms 1–3.

=== U-Bahn ===
Since 1988, the U-Bahn line U5 has served Ostbahnhof. U5 runs south to Neuperlach Süd via Innsbrucker Ring, and west to Laimer Platz via Max-Weber-Platz, Hauptbahnhof, and Theresienwiese. Trains run every ten minutes, and every five minutes during rush hour.

=== Tramway ===
The Ostbahnhof tram stop is located on Orleansplatz and is served by route 21.

== Train services ==
The station is served by the following services:

- RailJet services Munich - Salzburg - Linz - St Pölten - Vienna - Győr - Budapest

== Gallery ==
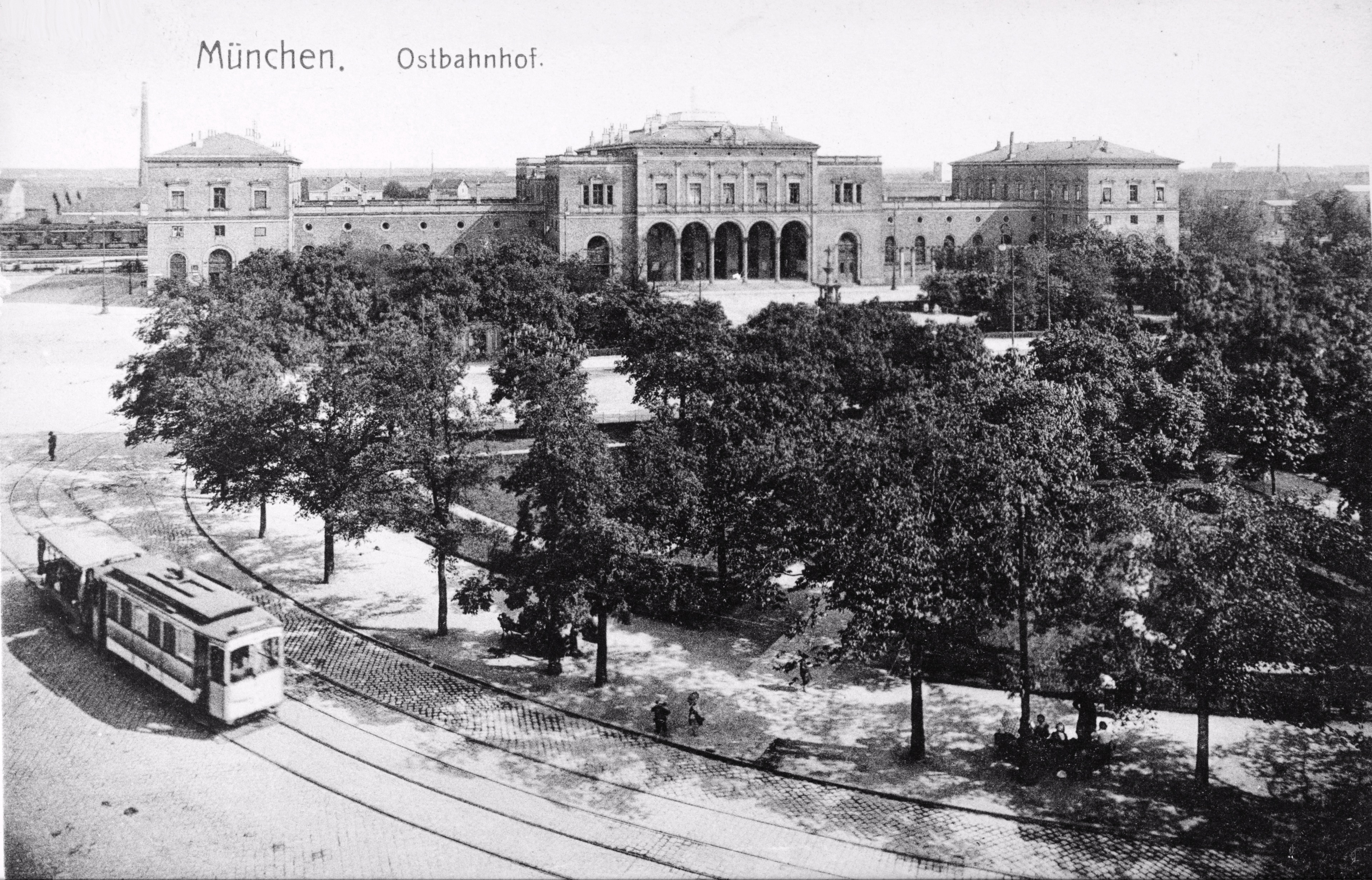
Ostbahnhof and Orleansplatz (1910)

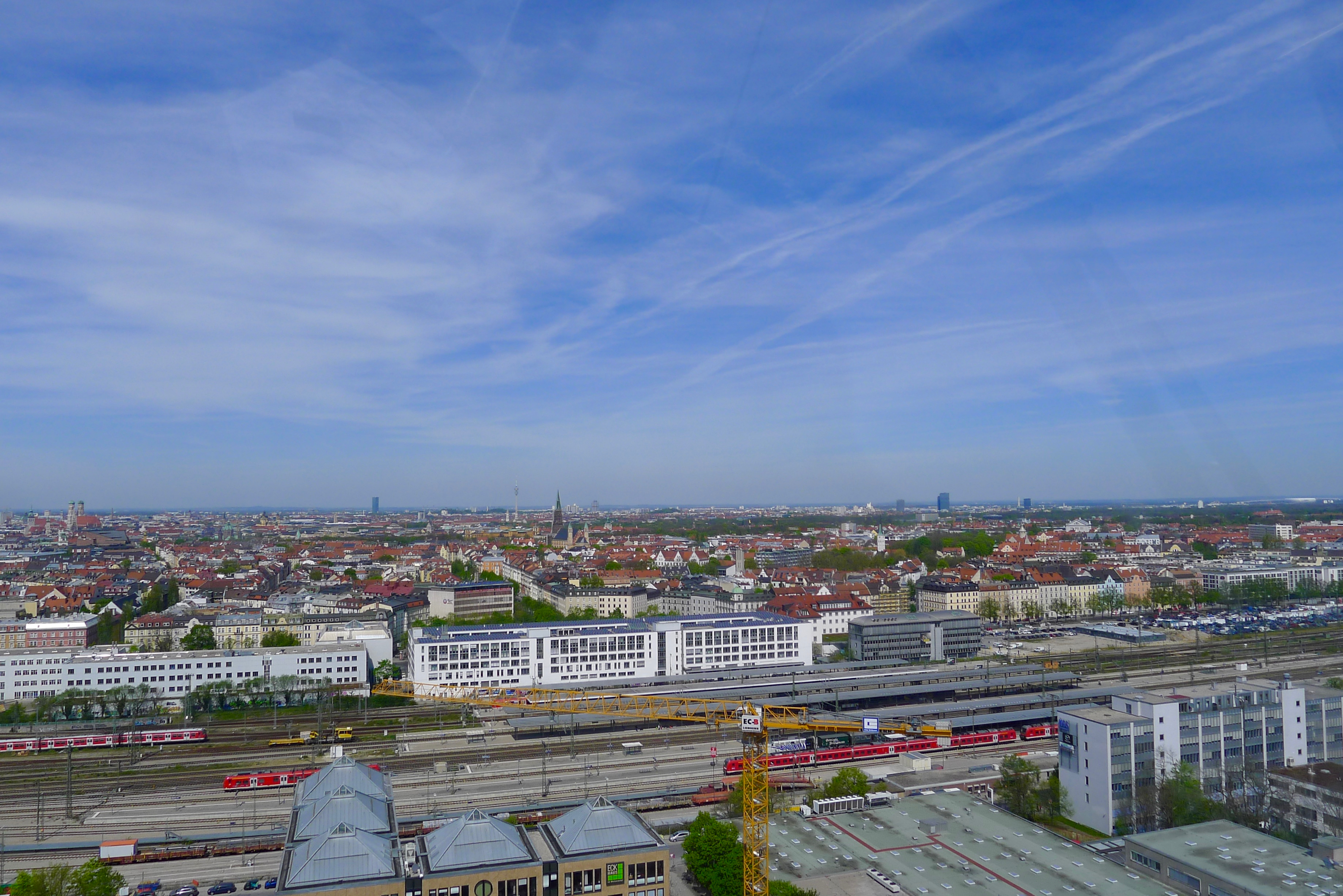
Ostbahnhof and Haidhausen seen from Werksviertel (2019)

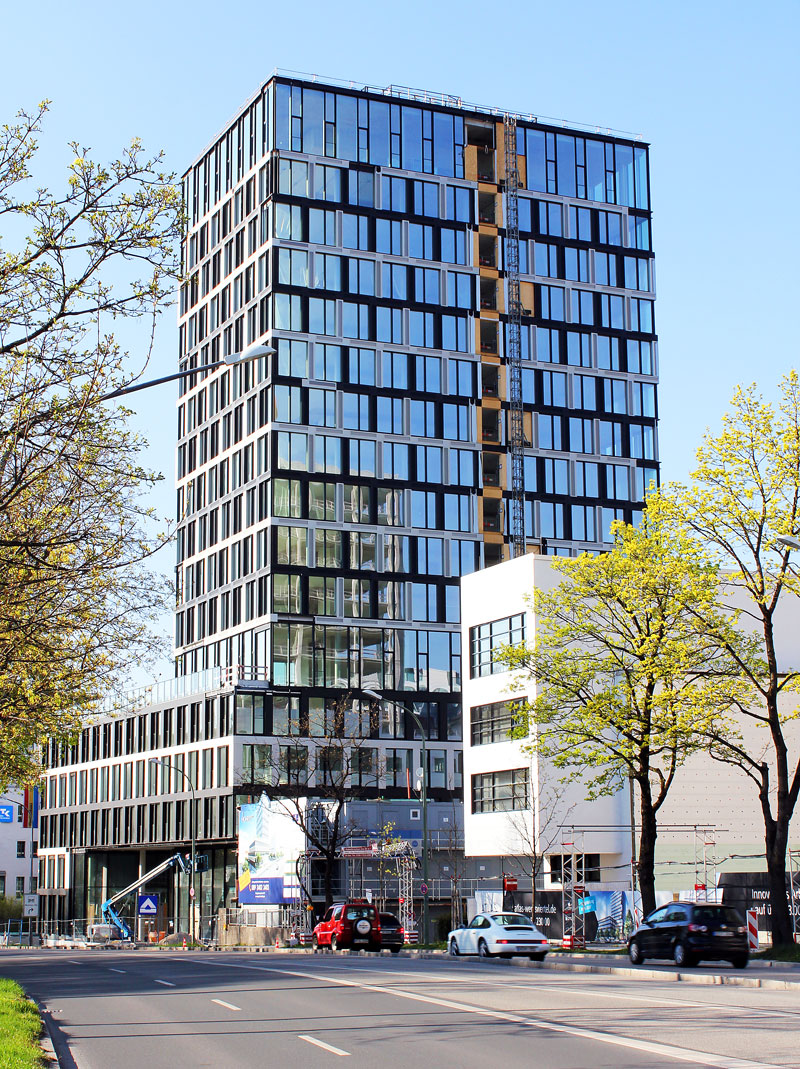
High Rise One, Berg am Laim (2017)

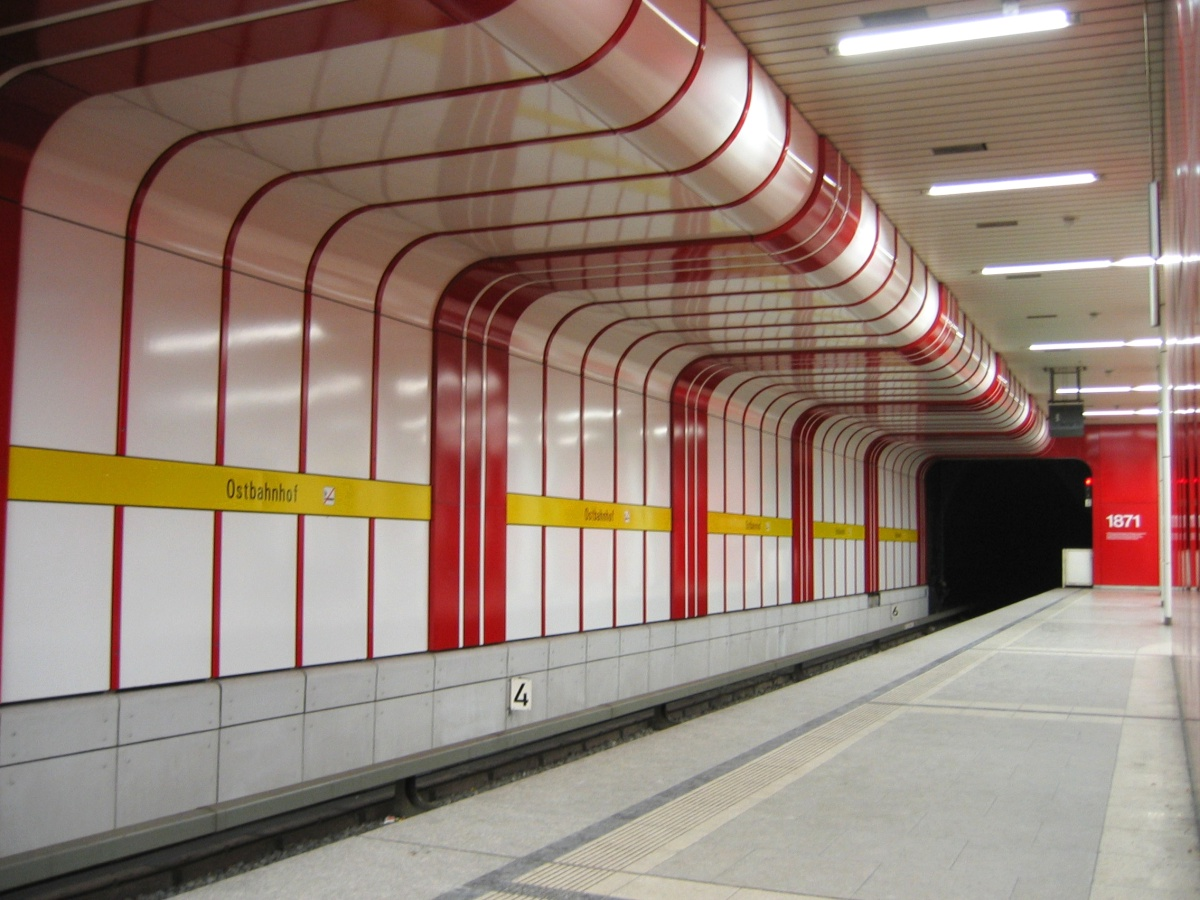
U-Bahn station (2006)

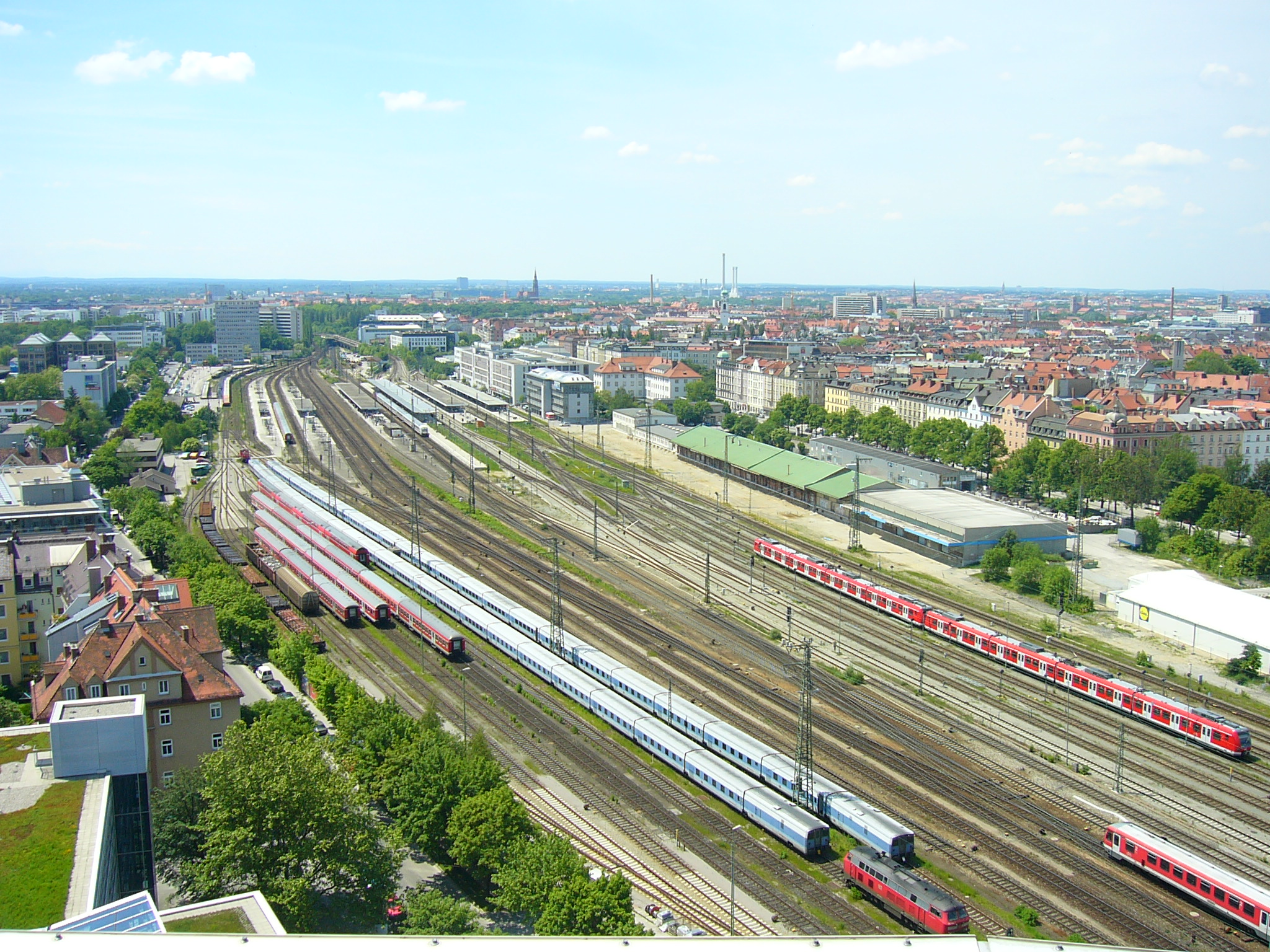
Railway tracks, view from Technisches Rathaus (2006)
