= Munich-Giesing–Kreuzstraße railway =

Munich-Giesing–Kreuzstraße
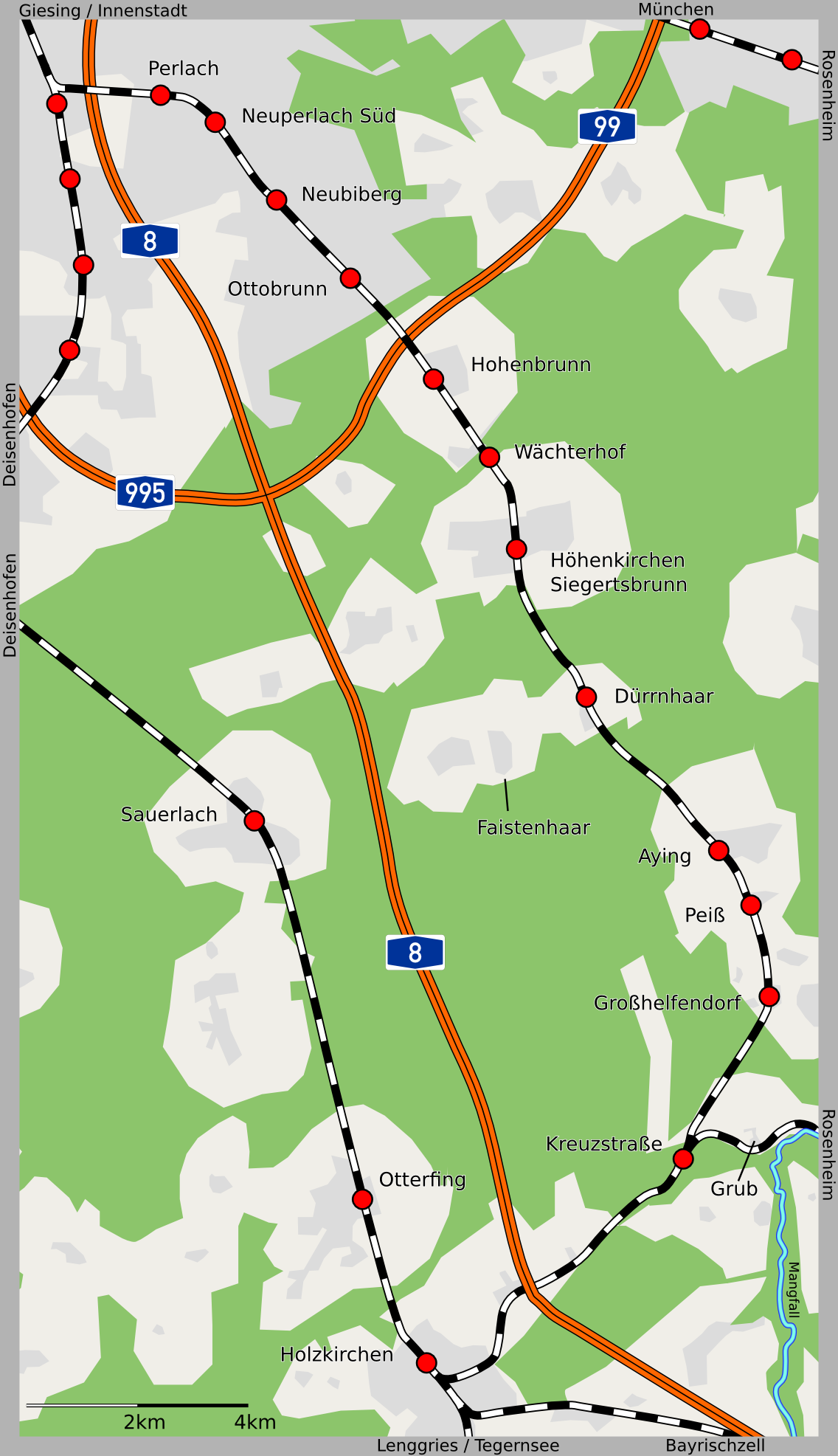
- Map of the line between the junction of the line to Deisenhofen and Kreuzstraße

Overview
- Line number: 5552
- Locale: Bavaria, Germany

Service
- Route number: 999.7

Technical
- Line length: 27.9 km (17.3 mi)
- Track gauge: 1,435 mm (4 ft 8 1/2 in) standard gauge
- Electrification: 15 kV/16.7 Hz AC overhead catenary

The Munich-Giesing–Kreuzstraße railway is a single-track, electrified line on the southern edge of Munich in the German state of Bavaria. It is served by Munich S-Bahn line S 7.

== Route ==
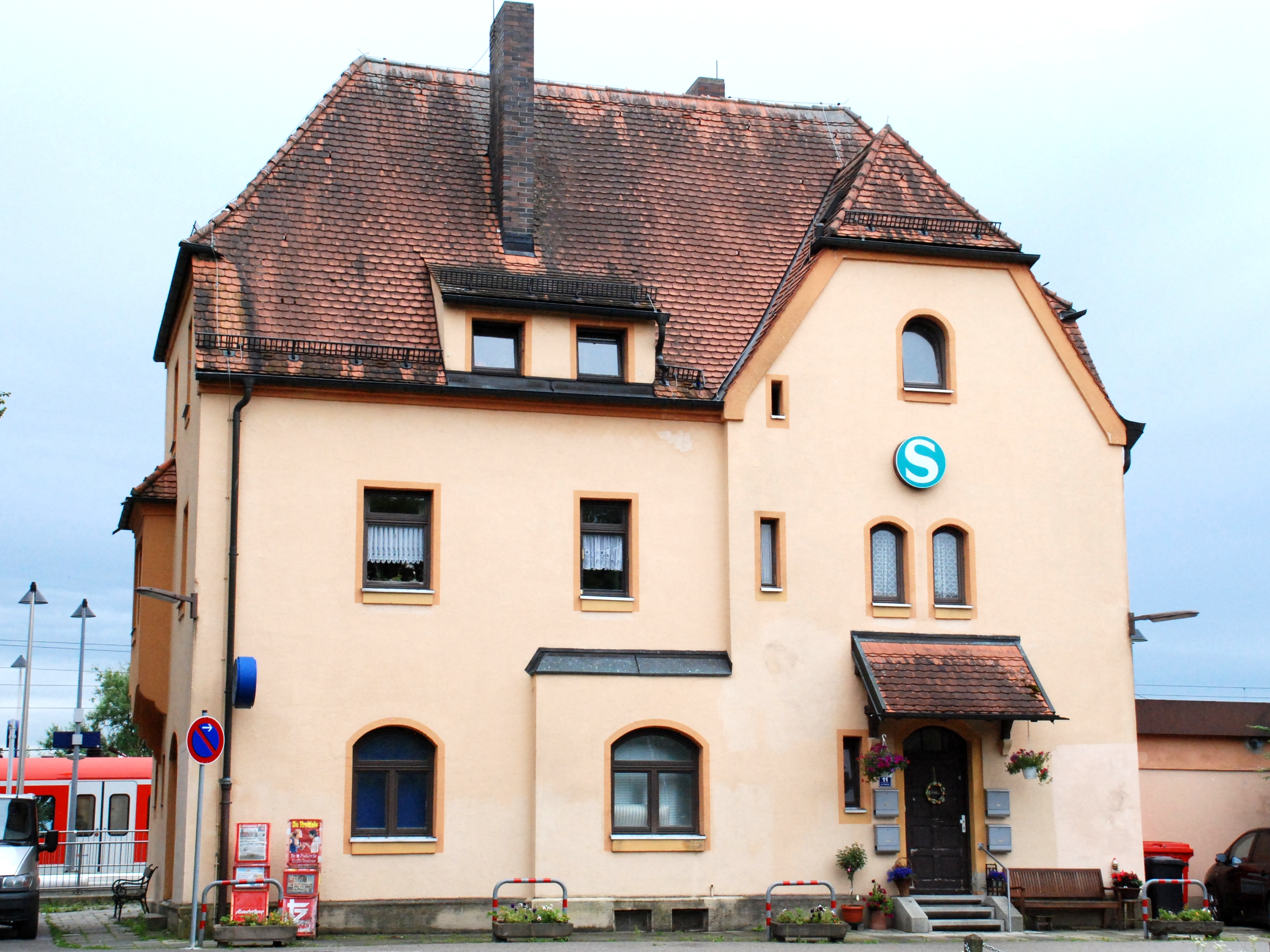
Aying station

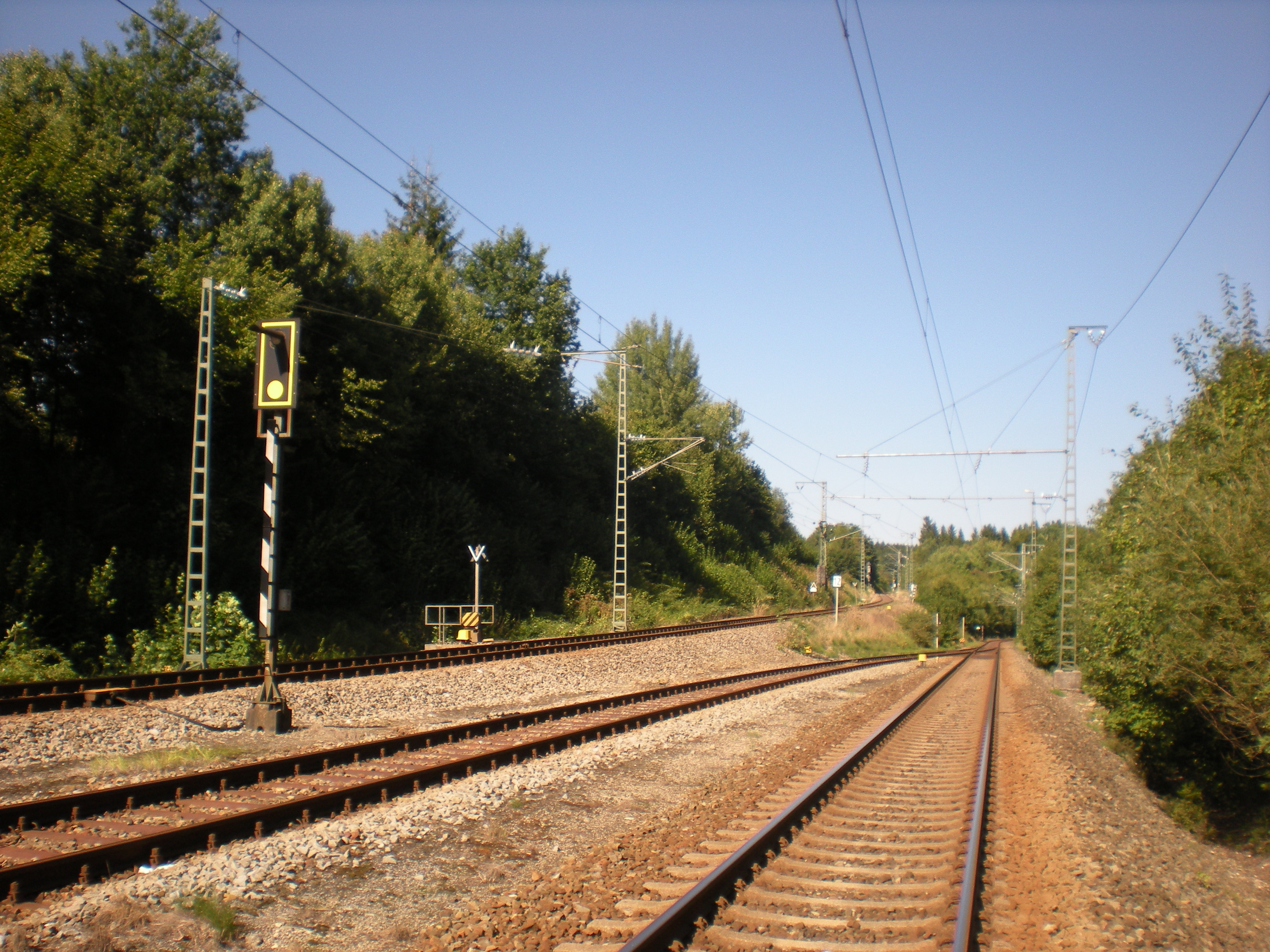
Junction of the Mangfall Valley Railway at Kreuzstraße station.

The line branches off the Munich East–Deisenhofen railway between the stations of Giesing and Fasangarten. The section of line from Munich East up to this point is one of the few in Germany that has traffic running on the left. This feature allows S-Bahn services from Munich St. Martinstrasse to be inserted into the S-Bahn line at Munich East while simultaneously reversing to run into the S-Bahn tunnel under central Munich or vice versa. South of Ständlerstraße there is a flying junction where the two tracks change sides. At this point, the line to Kreuzstraße branches off. After a short distance with two tracks (also operated with traffic running on the left) they combine and run east towards Munich-Perlach. Here it crosses Autobahn A 8. After Perlach station the line turns southeast. The following station, Neuperlach Süd is the only one in Munich at which the U-Bahn and the S-Bahn share a platform. The station is located on a bridge over Carl-Wery-Straße. The line runs through the municipalities of Neubiberg and Ottobrunn. After crossing the Munich ring road and federal highway B 471, the line reaches Hohenbrunn station. Wächterhof station lies east of town in the woods. Höhenkirchen-Siegertsbrunn station is located approximately midway between the two now close-knit neighbourhoods. The Aying municipality has four stations (Dürrnhaar, Aying, Peiß and Großhelfendorf). After Großhelfendorf station, the line runs in a southwesterly direction to Kreuzstraße. There it meets the Mangfall Valley Railway, running from Rosenheim to Holzkirchen. Kreuzstraße station is located in the Teufelsgraben valley; when it was opened the Kreuzstraße district of Valley had only a few houses.

== History ==
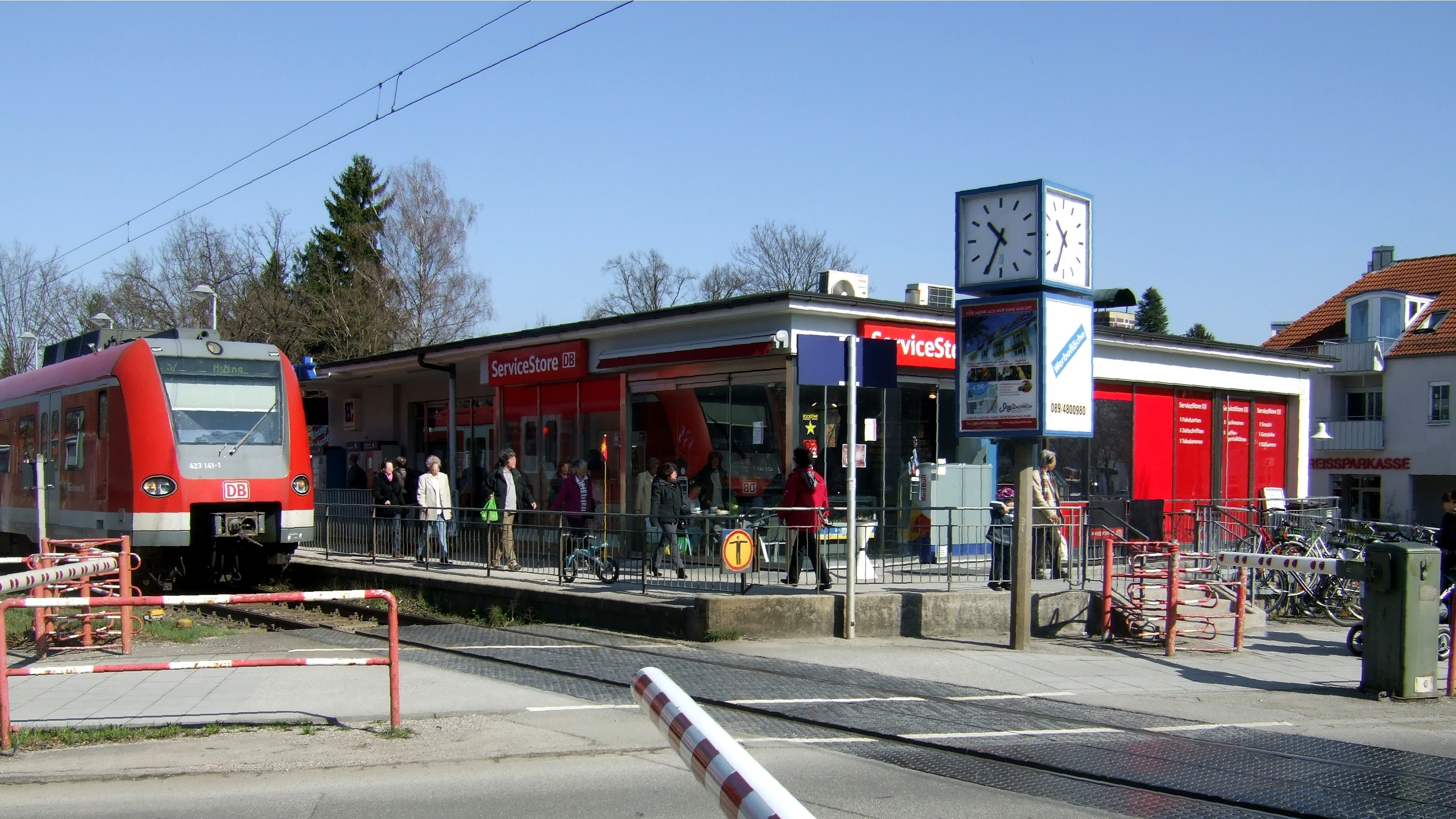
Ottobrunn station

The branch line, which originally ran only from Munich-Giesing to Aying, was one of the last radial railway lines built between Munich and its surroundings. The municipalities of Peiß, Helfendorf, Egmating, Siegertsbrunn, Hohenbrunn, Höhenkirchen, Brunnthal and Oberpframmern sought the construction of a railway from 1892. For the present, however, the Munich East–Deisenhofen line was given preference. According to the first plans, south of Aying/Peiß the line would run have run through Helfendorf to Grub, where it would have connected to the Mangfall Valley Railway. Also being considered was a route running west to Otterfing on the line from Deisenhofen to Holzkirchen or running directly to Holzkirchen. There was also disagreement over the location of the station in Dürrnhaar (the westernmost village of Faistenhaar wanted to see the route run further west) and the railhead in Aying. The latter was originally built further south between Aying and Peiß (near the current level crossing). The construction of the railway was approved on 2 March 1900. Construction started on the line on 1 April 1902. A train with several celebrities (including the Minister of Transport) made a trial run on the line on 28 May 1904 and it was opened shortly thereafter on 5 June. The extension of the line to Kreuzstraße went into operation in 1912. The line was electrified in 1971/72. On 28 May 1972, the opening day of the Munich S-Bahn, the section of line S 1 (then running Freising–Munich–Kreuzstraße) was opened to Hohenbrunn with train and bus services continuing towards Aying and Kreuzstraße. On 30 September 1973, these temporary services were abandoned and the S-Bahn was extended from Hohenbrunn to Kreuzstraße.

== Rail services ==
The line is served for its entire length by line S 5 of the Munich S-Bahn. Between the city and Aying services run at 20-minute intervals and between Aying and Kreuzstraße services run every 20 or 40 minutes alternatively (services run every 20 minutes during the peak hour).
