= Munich-Fasangarten station =

Munich S-Bahn station

München Fasangarten
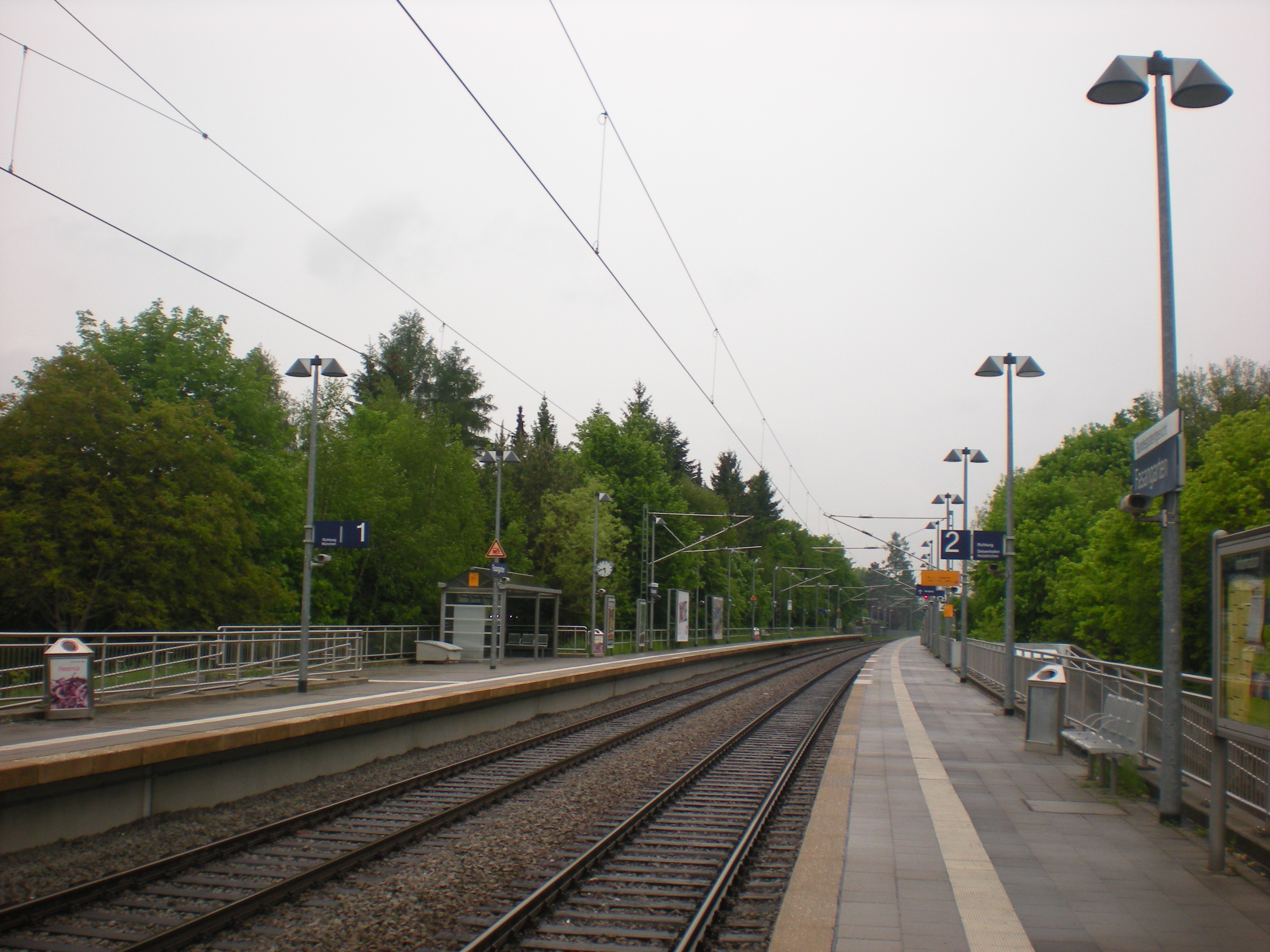

General information
- Location: Munich, Bavaria; Germany
- Coordinates: 48°5′29.27″N 11°36′23.29″E
- Owner: Deutsche Bahn
- Operator: DB Netz; DB Station&Service
- Lines: Munich East–Deisenhofen (KBS 999.3)
- Platforms: 2
- Tracks: 2
- Connections: 145

Other information
- Station code: 4252
- DS100 code: MFG
- IBNR: 8004146
- Category: 5
- Fare zone: : M
- Website: www.bahnhof.de

Services
Preceding station	Munich S-Bahn	Following station
Giesing towards Mammendorf	S3	Fasanenpark towards Holzkirchen
Location

Munich-Fasangarten station is a suburban railway station on the S3 line in Munich. Located just at the southeastern city limits, it serves areas including the former Ami-Siedlung, a neighborhood populated mostly by U.S. military personnel and their dependents until the mid-1990s.
