= S5 (Munich) =

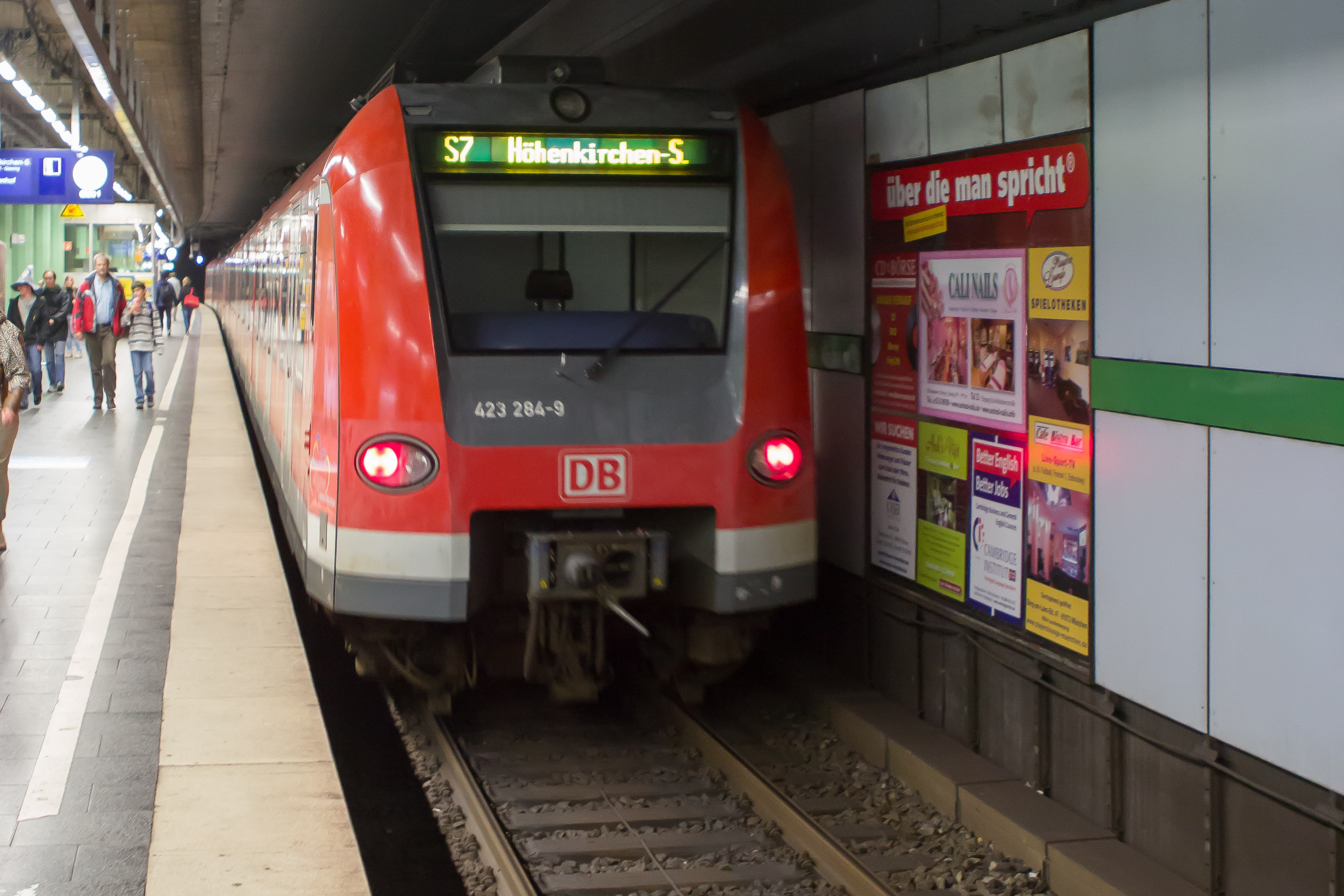

Overview
- Line number: S5
- Locale: Munich, Bavaria, Germany

Service
- System: Munich S-Bahn
- Route number: 999.5
- Operator: S-Bahn Munich
- Rolling stock: DBAG Class 423

Technical
- Electrification: 15 kV, 16.7 Hz AC Overhead lines

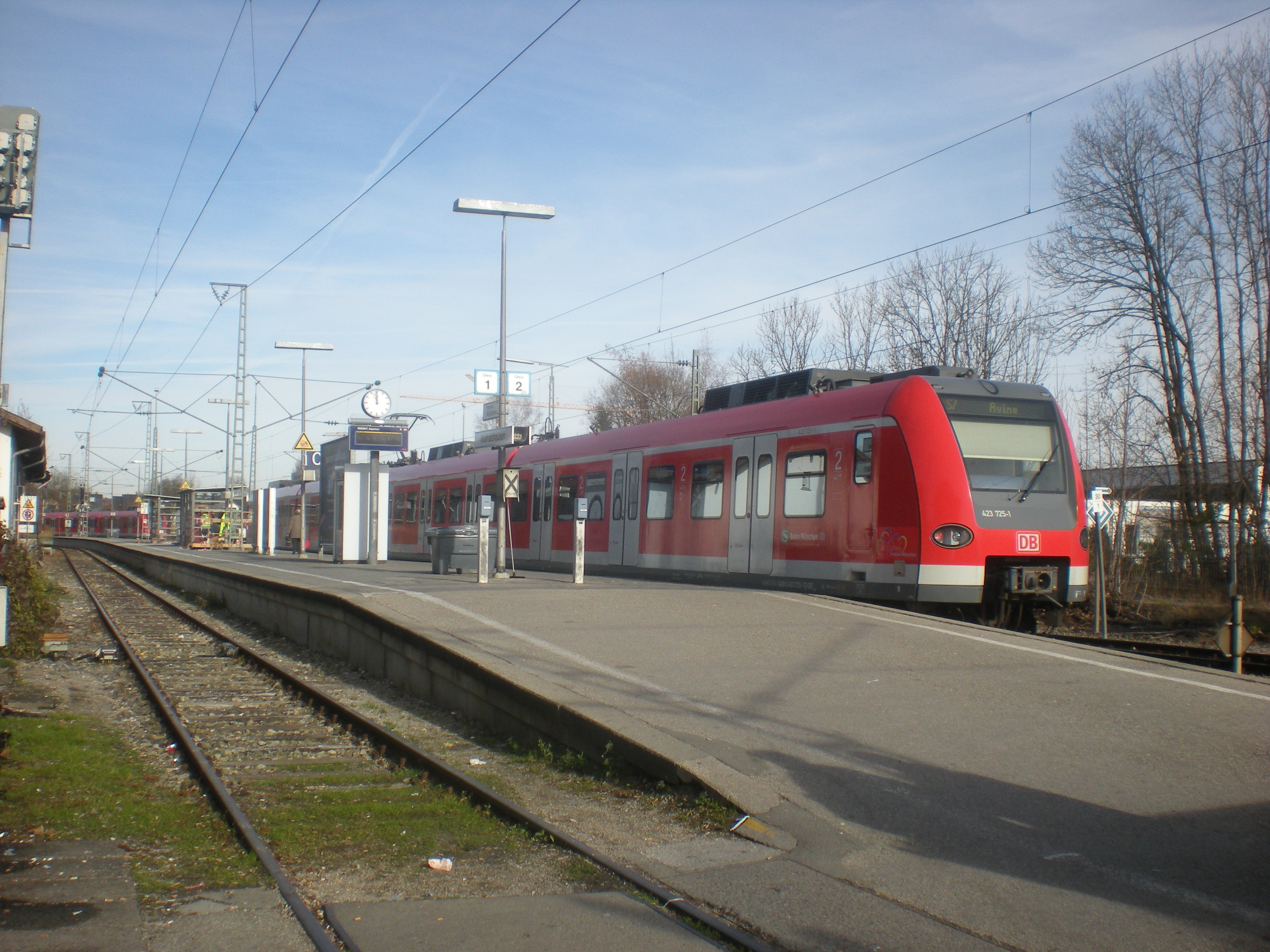
Class 423 train at Wolfratshausen station

Line S5 is a line on the Munich S-Bahn network. It is operated by DB Regio Bayern. It runs from Pasing via München Hauptbahnhof (central station), Höhenkirchen-Siegertsbrunn and Aying to Kreuzstraße. In rush hours, some trains run to Germering-Unterpfaffenhofen or Weßling. Trains reverse in Munich East station and, in order for S-Bahn services from St.-Martin-Straße to be inserted into the S-Bahn line while simultaneously reversing to run into the S-Bahn tunnel under central Munich or vice versa, the line between Munich East station and the flying junction between Munich-Giesing station and Munich-Fasangarten station is one of the few in Germany that has traffic running on the left.

The line is operated at 20-minute intervals between Pasing and Aying. Two out of three trains an hour continue from Aying to Kreuzstraße, so that the gap between trains alternates between 20 and 40 minutes. It is operated using class 423 four-car electrical multiple units, usually as two coupled sets.

The line runs over lines built at various times:

- from Weßling to Pasing over the Munich–Herrsching railway, opened on 1 July 1903 by the Royal Bavarian State Railways
- from Pasing to the beginning of the S-Bahn trunk line over tracks running parallel to the Munich–Augsburg railway, opened by the Munich–Augsburg Railway Company on 1 September 1839
- the S-Bahn trunk line from the approaches to Munich Central Station (Hauptbahnhof) to Munich East station, opened on 1 May 1971
- from Munich East station to Munich Frankenwaldstr. junction, south of Munich-Giesing station, on the Munich East–Deisenhofen railway, opened by the Royal Bavarian State Railways on 10 October 1898 and electrified in March 1971.
- from Munich Frankenwaldstr. junction to Kreuzstraße over the Munich-Giesing–Kreuzstraße railway, opened by the Royal Bavarian State Railways on 5 June 1904 and electrified in March 1971.

S-Bahn services commenced on 15 December 2024 when the line was split.
