= Obergiesing =

Borough of Munich, Germany

Coordinates: 48°06′40″N 11°35′40″E

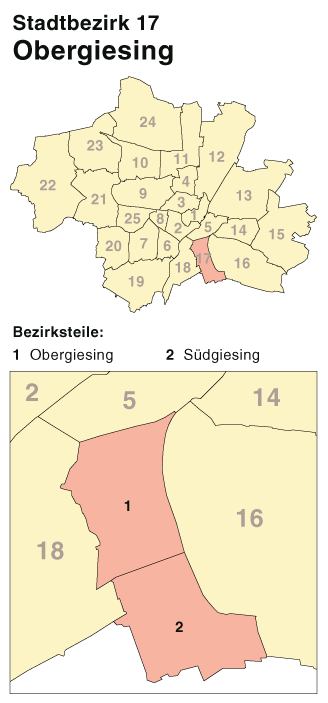
District map

Obergiesing (German pronunciation: [ˈoːbɐˌɡiːzɪŋ], lit. 'Upper Giesing'; Central Bavarian: Obagiasing) is a borough of Munich, about 5km south-east of the city center. The larger part is residential or a mix of business and residential, but there are also a number of recreational facilities.

== Education ==
The Lycée Jean Renoir, a French international school, maintains its primary school campus in Giesing.

== Gallery ==
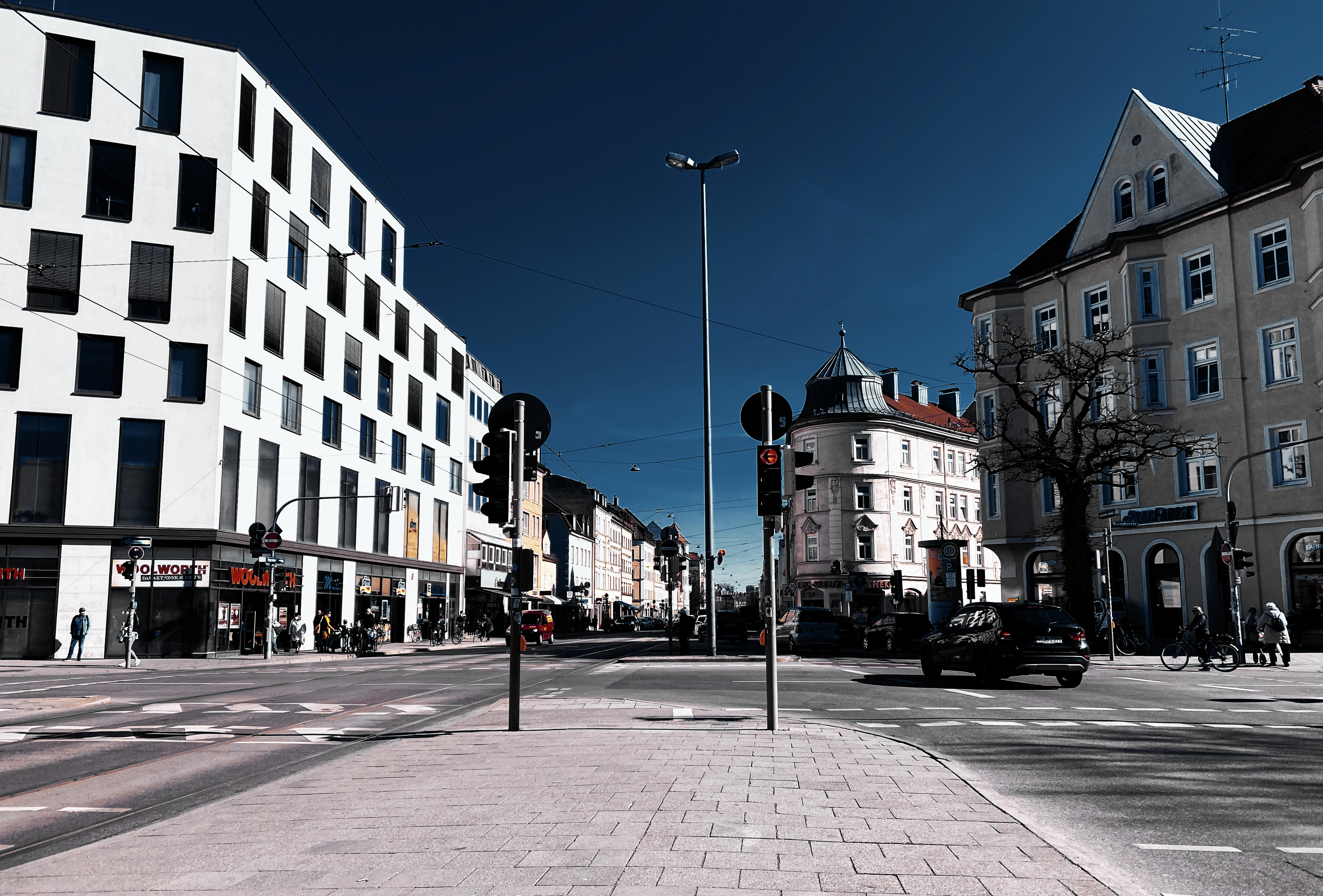
Center of Obergiesing

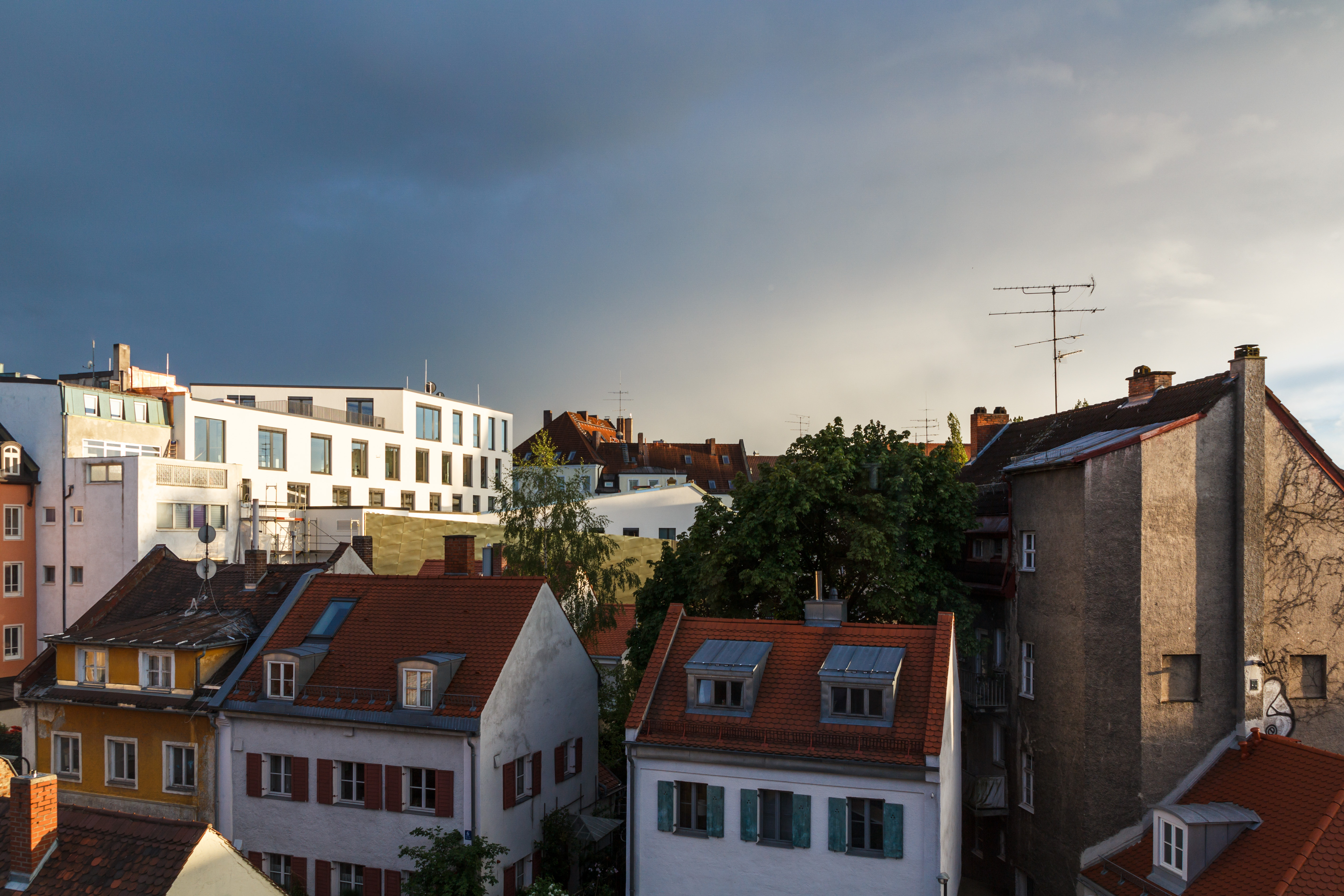
Historical Feldmüller settlement in Obergiesing

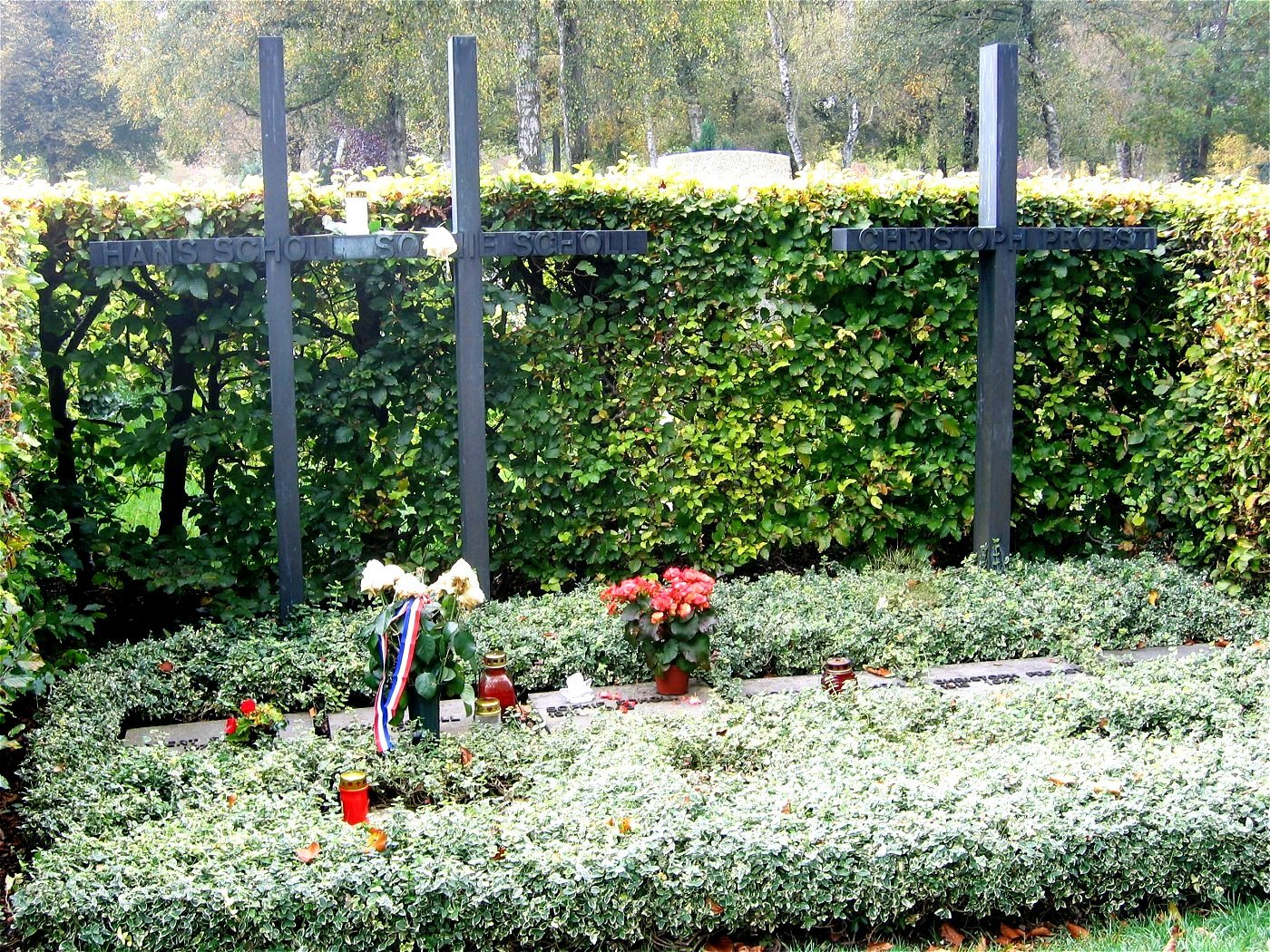
Grave of Sophie and Hans Scholl and Christoph Probst of the White Rose

== See also ==
- München-Giesing railway station
