= Munich East–Deisenhofen railway =

Railway line in Germany

München Ost–Deisenhofen railway
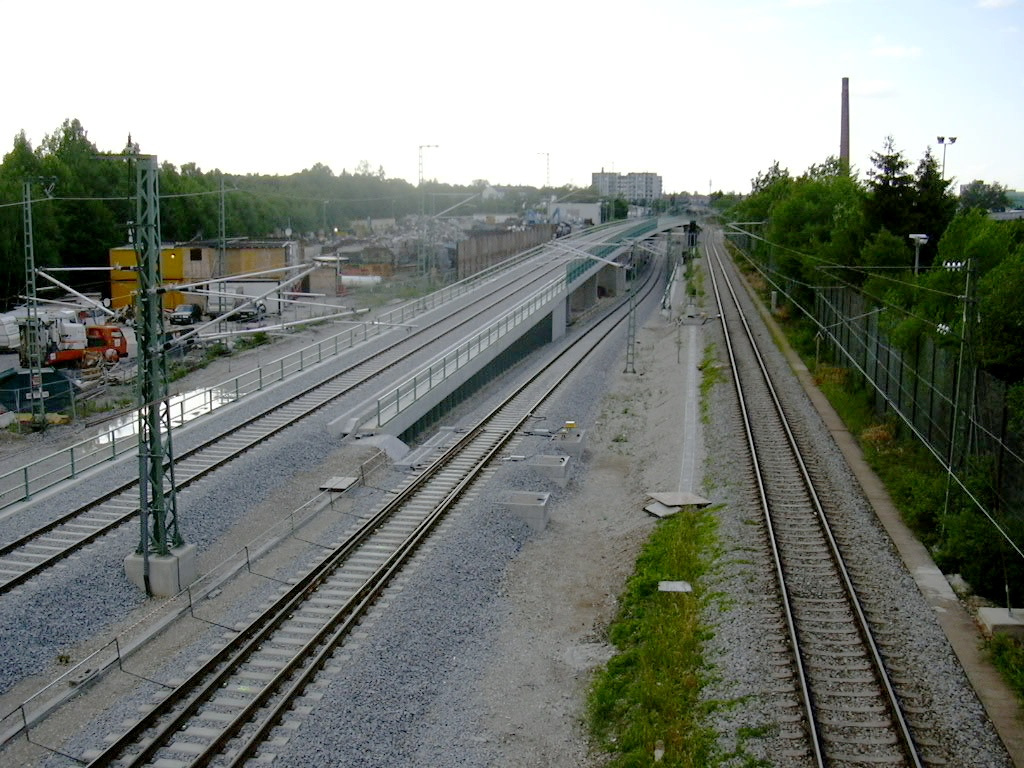
- Flying junction in Giesing

Overview
- Line number: 5551
- Locale: Bavaria, Germany

Service
- Route number: 999.3

Technical
- Line length: 13.0 km (8.1 mi)
- Track gauge: 1,435 mm (4 ft 8 1/2 in) standard gauge
- Electrification: 15 kV/16.7 Hz AC overhead catenary
- Operating speed: 120 km/h (74.6 mph) (max) with 2 sections of 100 km/h (62.1 mph) only

The Munich East–Deisenhofen railway is a continuously-electrified, double-track, railway in the German state of Bavaria. It connects Munich East station with Deisenhofen and was opened on 10 October 1898.

Today the line is used by Munich S-Bahn trains. The whole length of the line is served by S-Bahn line S 3 (Mammendorf–Holzkirchen). Between Munich East and Munich-Giesing it is also served by line S 7 (Wolfratshausen–Kreuzstraße).

Between Munich East station and the flying junction between Munich-Giesing and Fasangarten stations the line is one of the few in Germany that has traffic running on the left. This feature allows S-Bahn services from München St.-Martin-Straße to be inserted into the S-Bahn line at Munich East while simultaneously reversing to run into the S-Bahn tunnel under central Munich or vice versa.
