= Ottobrunn =

- Municipality
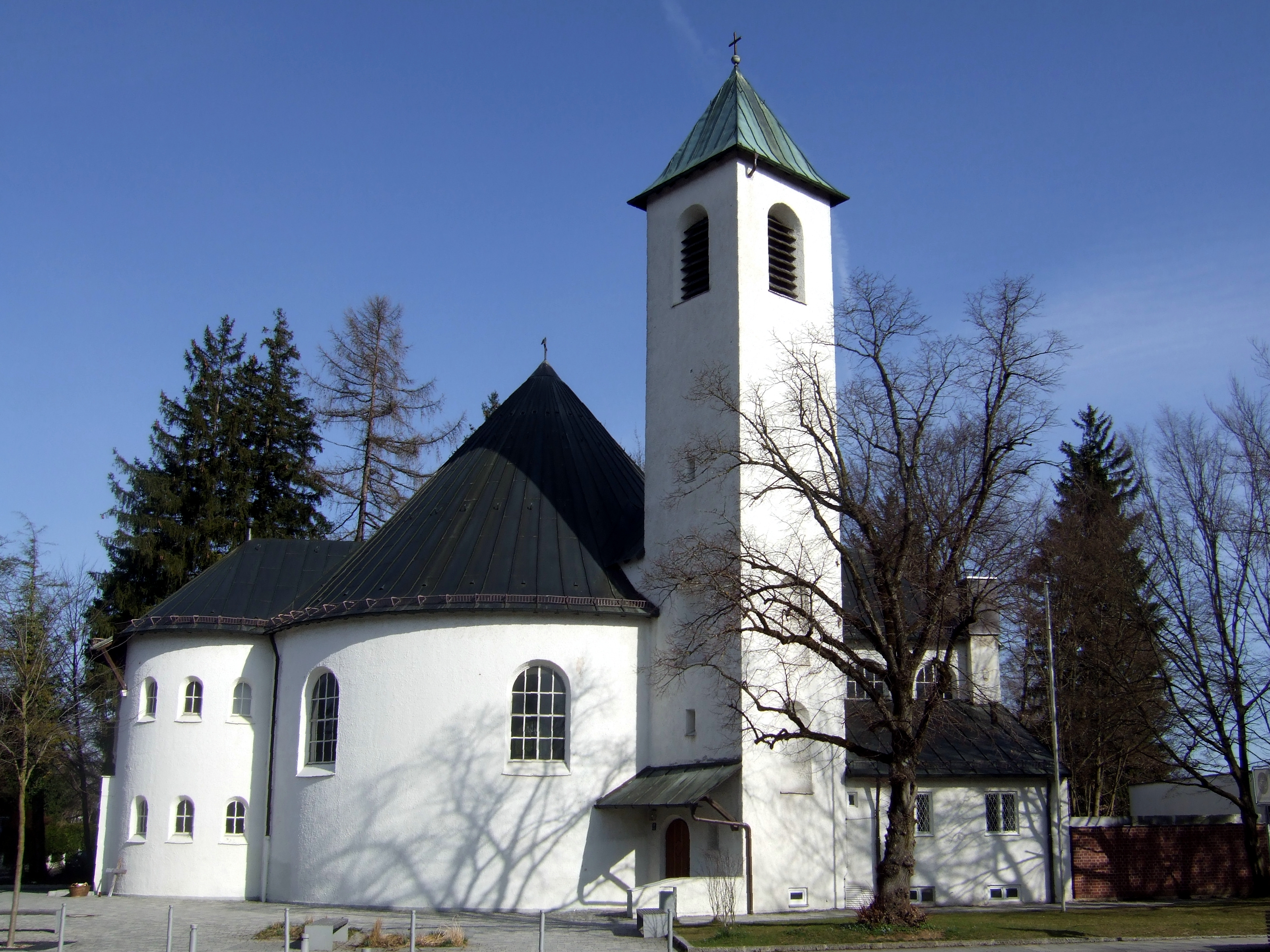
- Saint Otto Church

- Coat of arms

- Location of Ottobrunn within Munich district
- Interactive map of Ottobrunn
- Location within Germany Location within Bavaria
- Coordinates: 48°04′N 11°40′E
- Country: Germany
- State: Bavaria
- Admin. region: Oberbayern
- District: Munich

Government
  - Mayor: Florian Schardt (SPD)

Area
  - Total: 5.23 km^{2} (2.02 sq mi)
- Elevation: 557 m (1,827 ft)

Population (2025-12-31)
  - Total: 22,729
  - Density: 4,350/km^{2} (11,300/sq mi)
- Time zone: UTC+01:00 (CET)
  - Summer (DST): UTC+02:00 (CEST)
- Postal codes: 85521
- Dialling codes: 089
- Vehicle registration: M
- Website: www.ottobrunn.de

Ottobrunn (German: [ɔtoˈbʁʊn]) is a suburban municipality southeast of Munich, Bavaria, Germany, founded in 1955. Ottobrunn consists of mainly semi-detached and detached houses, as well as extensive garden areas. Ottobrunn is also the German Headquarters of Airbus Defense and Space (former European Aeronautic Defence and Space Company (EADS)), with the majority of Airbus DS grounds situated in the neighbouring community of Taufkirchen. According to the Federal Statistical Office of Germany, the municipality is the second-most densely populated in all of Germany, trailing only Munich, and ahead of Berlin.

The current Bürgermeister, town major, is Florian Schardt.

== History ==
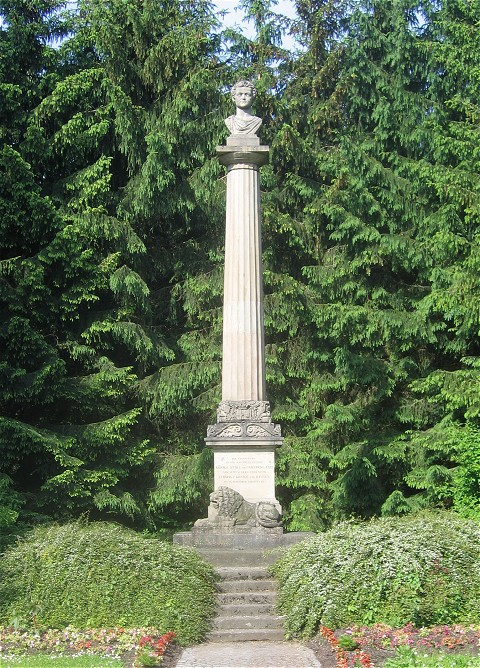
The Ottosäule

The town's center was established in the mid-1980s with the town hall (1983) and the community centre (1986). The community centre was named after the German-Italian composer Ermanno Wolf-Ferrari who lived in Ottobrunn between 1915 and 1931.

There is a memorial Doric order column, called the Ottosäule, made by the chiseler Anton Ripfel, commemorating the day in 1832 when Otto of Greece traveled past the present community area on his way to become king of Greece. It was originally situated exactly 12 km (7.5 mi) from the center of Munich, marking the exact spot on the route where Otto of Greece's father left his son. The column was moved, however, 9 m (30 ft) southwest, to make room for widening the Rosenheimer Landstrasse.

== Twin towns – sister cities ==
Ottobrunn is twinned with:

- Mandelieu-la-Napoule, France
- Margreid an der Weinstraße, Italy
- Nafplio, Greece

== See also ==
- Ottobrunn railway station
