= Giesing =

Quarter of Munich, Germany

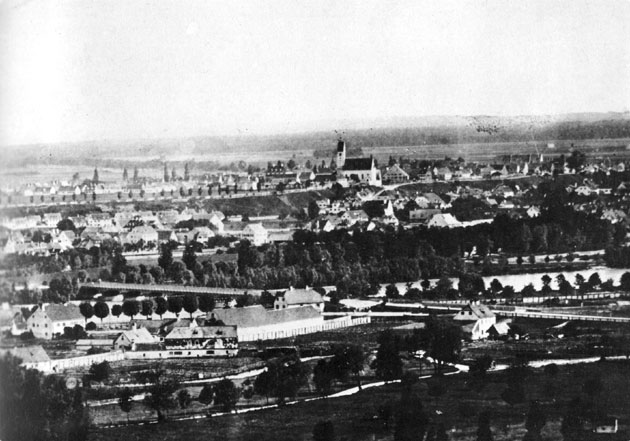
View of Giesing in 1858, seen from Munich

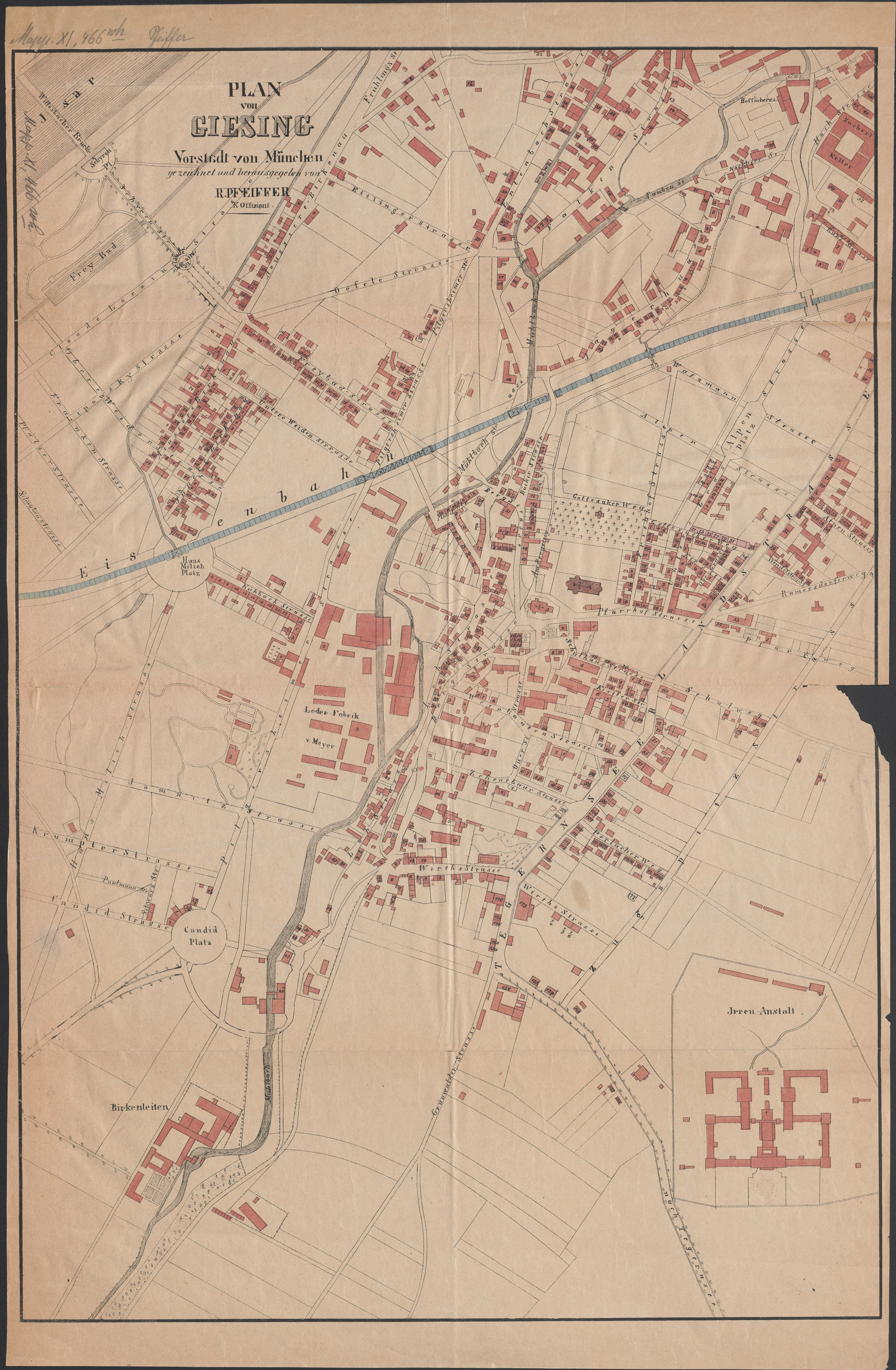
1881 map

Giesing (German pronunciation: [ˈɡiːzɪŋ]; formerly Kyesinga) was a Bavarian town founded in 790 (older than Munich). The town was incorporated by the city of Munich in October 1854. Since then, it is a borough of the metropolis.

Giesing is located south-east of Munich and has a population of 80,986 as of 2019-12-31.

It consists of Obergiesing (part of Stadtbezirk 17 Obergiesing-Fasangarten) and Untergiesing (part of Stadtbezirk 18 Untergiesing-Harlaching). These sub-entities are divided in the Southern part by Auer Mühlbach.

Giesing was one of the first villages in the perimeter of Munich to be incorporated into the city of Munich in 1854.

The first McDonald's restaurant in Germany was opened there in 1971. The Military Government for Bavaria was located in the former Reichszeugmeisterei. McGraw Kaserne and the Prison Munich Stadelheim are located there. In this prison the members of the Weisse Rose (White Rose) Resistance group were killed by the Nazis and buried in the Perlacher Forest Cemetery which is the former Prison Cemetery. Nowadays, Giesing is considered a multi-cultural district with people from various different cultural backgrounds. Its relatively moderate renting fees have made the district popular amongst students and artists.

== See also ==
- History of Munich
- Timeline of Munich
