= Kreuzstraße station =

Railway station in Bavaria, Germany

Kreuzstraße
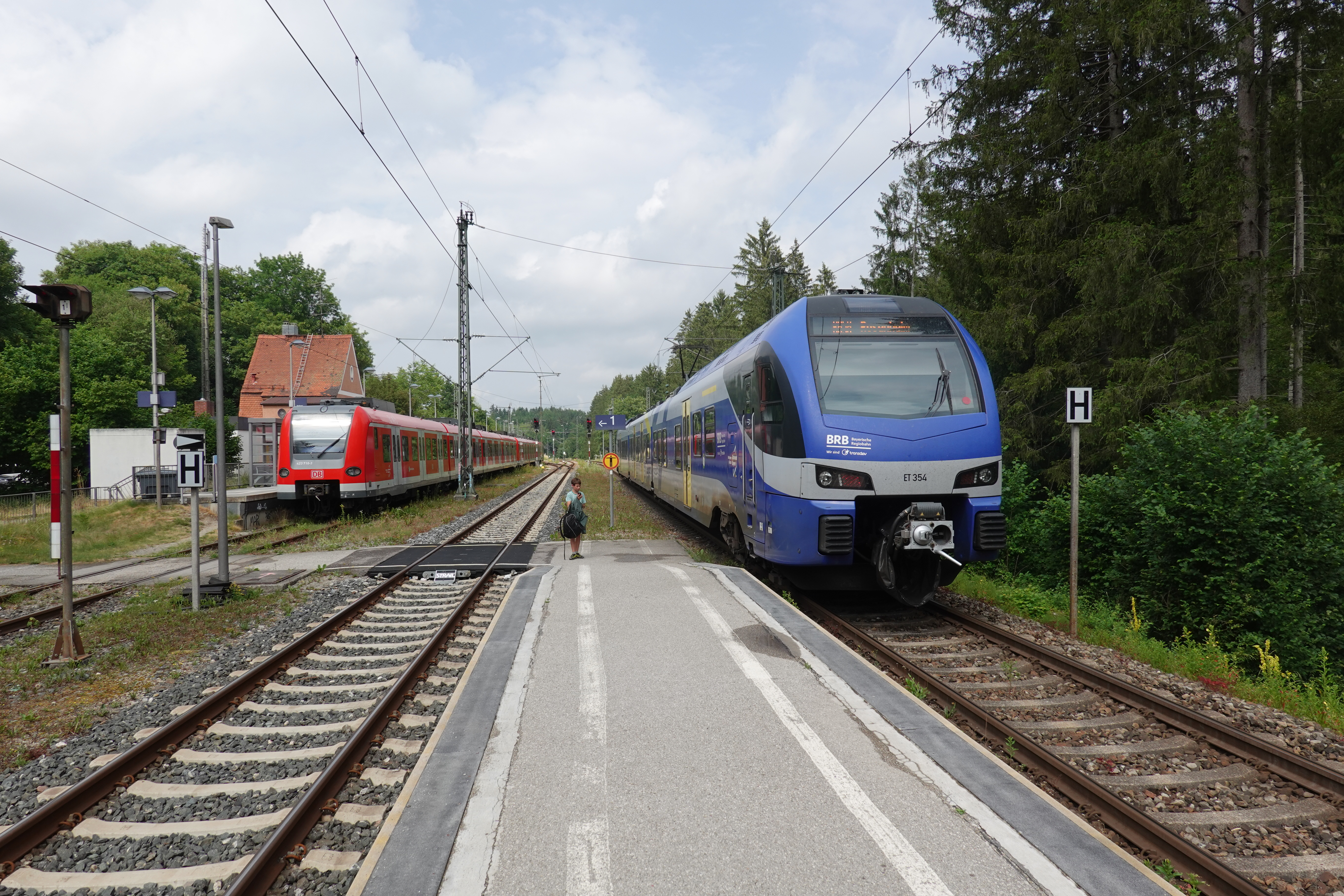
- 2023

General information
- Location: Römerstraße 24; 83626 Valley; Bavaria; Germany
- Coordinates: 47.9171°N 11.7593°E
- System: Bf
- Owner: Deutsche Bahn
- Operator: DB Netz; DB Station&Service
- Lines: Mangfall Valley Railway; Munich-Giesing–Kreuzstraße railway
- Platforms: 1 island platform 1 side platform
- Tracks: 3
- Train operators: Bayerische Regiobahn; S-Bahn München

Other information
- Station code: 3419
- DS100 code: MKZ
- IBNR: 8003438
- Category: 6
- Fare zone: : 3 and 4
- Website: www.bahnhof.de

History
- Opened: 25 November 1912; 113 years ago

Services
Preceding station		Following station
Holzkirchen towards München Hbf	RB 58	Westerham towards Rosenheim
Preceding station	Munich S-Bahn	Following station
Großhelfendorf towards Weßling	S5	Terminus
Location
- Location within Bavaria Location within Germany Location within Europe

Kreuzstraße station is a railway station in the Kreuzstraße district of the municipality of Valley, located in the Miesbach district in Upper Bavaria, Germany.
