= Roman Catholic Deanery of Munich-Perlach =

The Roman Catholic Deanery of Munich Perlach (German: "Dekanat München-Perlach") is a deanery of the Roman Catholic Church in the Archdiocese of Munich and Freising. At the moment, eight parishes belong to the deanery and there are currently c.48,000 Catholics living in the deanery, which roughly encompasses the area of district number 16 of the City of Munich, "Ramersdorf-Perlach" and the area of the municipality Neubiberg, south-east of Munich. The diocesan agenda for structural reorganization (Strukturplan 2020) regrouped the eight parishes as three pastoral unions and the borough parish ("Stadtteilkirche") of Neuperlach. The new common patronage of "Christ the Redeemer") fused five previously independent parishes. The Dean is Christian Penzkofer and the Sub-Dean is Bodo Windolf.

== List of churches in the deanery ==
Picture	Church	Borough / municipality	Associated churches	Further remarks
	St. Pius	Berg am Laim	Part of the pastoral unit of Maria Ramersdorf-St. Pius	
	St. Maria Ramersdorf	Ramersdorf (old town center)	Part of the pastoral unit Maria Ramersdorf-St. Pius	A pilgrimage church
	St. Bernhard	Balanstraße West	From 2020, this will be part of the München-Giesing Deanery.	
	Patrona Bavariae	Fasangarten	A filial church of St. Bernhard	
	Königin der Märtyrer	Obergiesing	A filial church of St. Bernhard	
	Verklärung Christi	Ramersdorf	Part of the pastoral unit Verklärung Christi-St. Michael	
	St. Michael	Perlach	Part of the pastoral unit of Verklärung Christi-St. Michael	
	St. Georg	Unterbiberg	A filial church of St. Michael	
	St. Jakobus	Neuperlach North West	Part of the Borough Parish of Christ the Redeemer (Neuperlach)	The church which hosted the Italian‑speaking Catholic Mission of the diocese. The building closed in 2011 and was demolished in 2013. There are plans for a new building
	St. Monika	Neuperlach North East	Part of the Borough Parish of Christ the Redeemer (Neuperlach)	
	St. Stephan	Neuperlach Zentrum West (Hochhausring)	Part of the Borough Parish of Christ the Redeemer (Neuperlach)	
	St. Philipp Neri	Neuperlach Center East	Part of the Borough Parish of Christ the Redeemer (Neuperlach)	
	St. Maximilian Kolbe	Neuperlach South	Part of the Borough Parish of Christ the Redeemer (Neuperlach)	The parish center also hosts the Catholic youth center of the deanery, a center of Caritas and is the seat of the KjG
	Maria Rosenkranzkönigin Neubiberg	Neubiberg	Part of the pastoral unit of Rosenkranzkönigi-Bruder Klaus	
	Military chaplaincy and church of the University of Federal Armed Forces	University of the Bundeswehr Munich in Neubiberg	University and garrison church	The base of local branches of Katholische Hochschulgemeinde (KHG) and Gemeinschaft Katholischer Soldaten (GKS)
	Bruder Klaus	Waldperlach	Part of the pastoral unit Rosenkranzkönigin-Bruder Klaus	

== Catholic organizations and groups in the deanery Perlach ==
=== Bund der Deutschen Katholischen Jugend (BDKJ) im Dekanat München-Perlach ===
The Catholic youth organizations (KjG and scouts) of the deanery comprise the Bund der Deutschen Katholischen Jugend (English: Association of the German Catholic Youth). The BDKJ Perlach represents the political, social and ecclesiastical interests of the Catholic youth of Perlach in the Church and society, particularly at the regional assembly of the BDKJ.

==== Deanery association of the Katholische junge Gemeinde in Perlach (kjg Perlach) ====
The katholische junge Gemeinde (kjg) Perlach is the youth organization bringing together the parish youth at deanery level. It organizes regular meetings and activities. It is part of the diocesan association of the Katholische junge Gemeinde (KjG München und Freising).

==== DPSG in Perlach ====
There are two local scouting groups in the deanery which belong to the Deutsche Pfadfinderschaft Sankt Georg (DPSG): The "Camilo Torres" troop was founded in 1967 and is part of the parish of Christ the Redeemer. The "Sankt Michael Perlach" troop is based in the parish of St. Michael. It was founded on 8 May 1992.

=== Kolping Organization in Neubiberg ===
There is a local branch of the Kolping Association in the parish of Rosenkranzkönigin in the municipality of Neubiberg. It was founded on 13 March 1988. Since then, the membership of the local group has increased and it now has 86 members.

=== Katholische Frauengemeinschaft Deutschlands (kfd) ===
There is also a local group of the Katholischen Frauengemeinschaft Deutschlands (kfd), which is one of the main Catholic women's associations in Germany. It is based in the Maximilian-Kolbe parish center in the parish of Christ the Redeemer. Until 1997 there was also a group in St. Michael in Altperlach.
