= Orleansplatz =

Square in Munich, Germany

Coordinates: 48°07′42″N 11°36′12″E

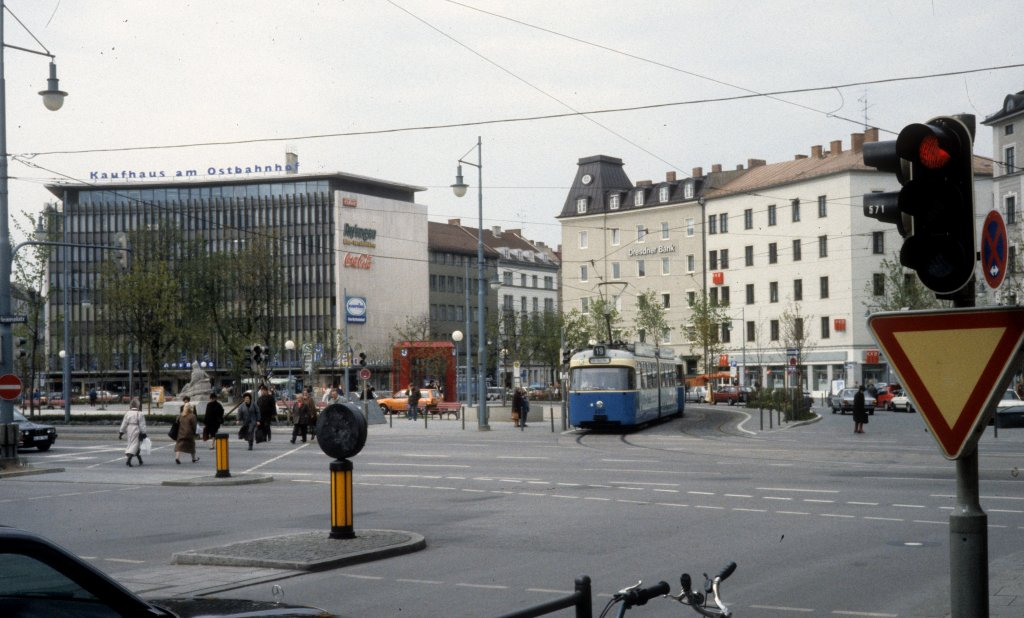
View to the north towards Haidhausen (1990)

The semi-circular Orleansplatz is located in the Munich district of Haidhausen opposite the Ostbahnhof, where the S-Bahn, U-Bahn line 5 and various bus lines stop. There is also a stop for tram line 19 on Orleansplatz.

The front of Orleansplatz is marked by an elongated fountain which runs parallel to Orleansstraße. The square is lined with trees and benches. This is a place for regular festivals and markets - such as the original Hamburger Fisch Markt. Several Social Service Offices are located at Orleansplatz 11 and immediately next to the square is a Registration Office of the district administration department (Orleansstraße 50). In addition, food markets, a department store, fast food restaurants etc. are located around Orleansplatz.

Starting from Orleansplatz, three streets like open up like "rays" into the so-called French Quarter, which owes its name to the fact that, after the German victory in the Franco-Prussian War (1870/1871), the city planners decided in 1872 to lay out the streets and squares here according to the French pattern and to have the streets run into squares in a star shape. In addition, names were chosen for places where German armies won battles in the Franco-Prussian War - such as the Battle of Orléans (Département Loiret).

Orleansplatz was once the site of the Glaspalastbrunnen (glass palace fountain), designed by August von Voit for the Glaspalast in 1853. It was moved to Orleansplatz at the end of the 19th century. When, however, the reconstruction of the Ostbahnhof was due, the fountain was moved to Weißenburger Platz and a new, elongated fountain was built.

== Gallery ==
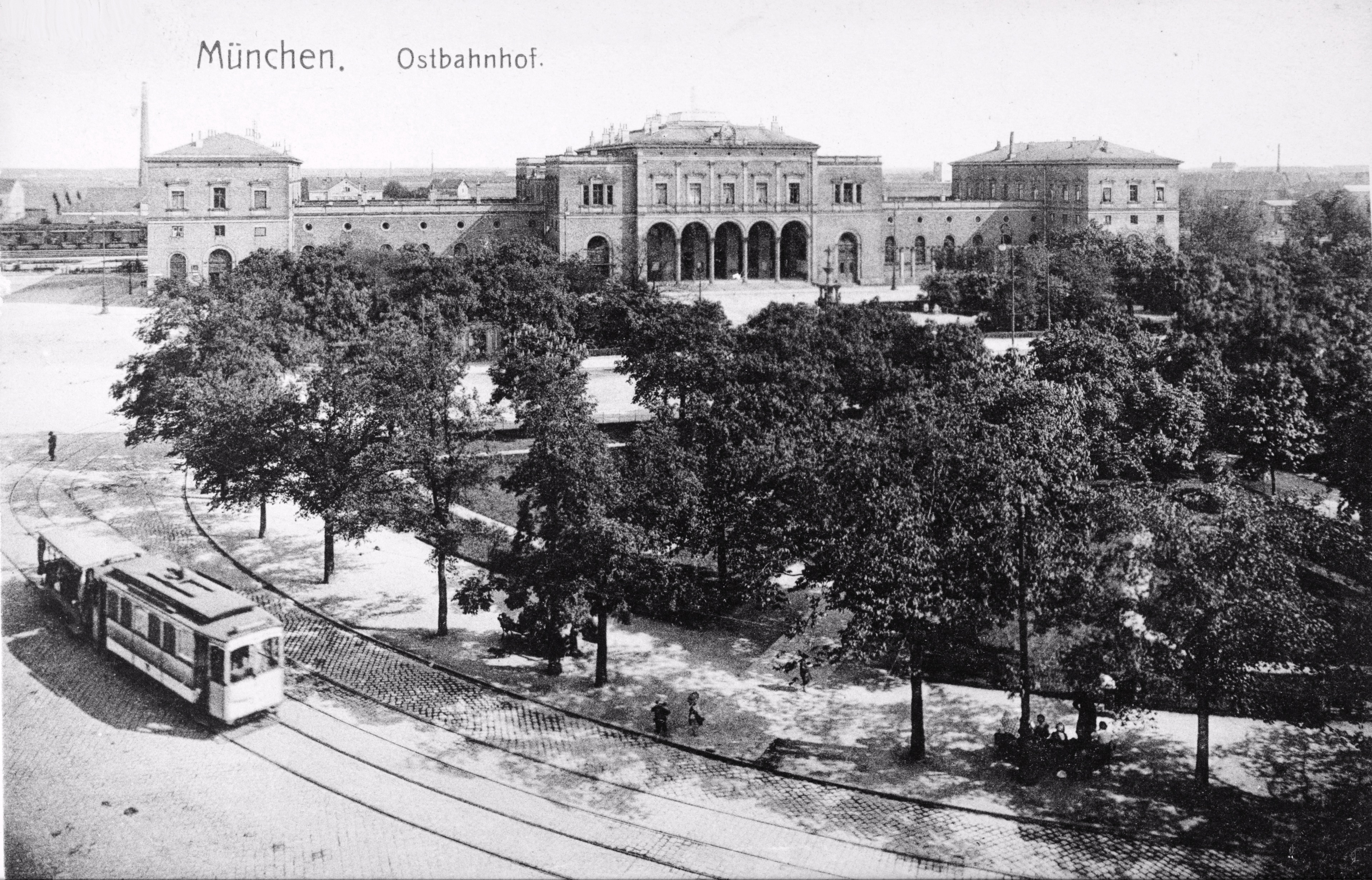
Ostbahnhof and Orleansplatz (1910)

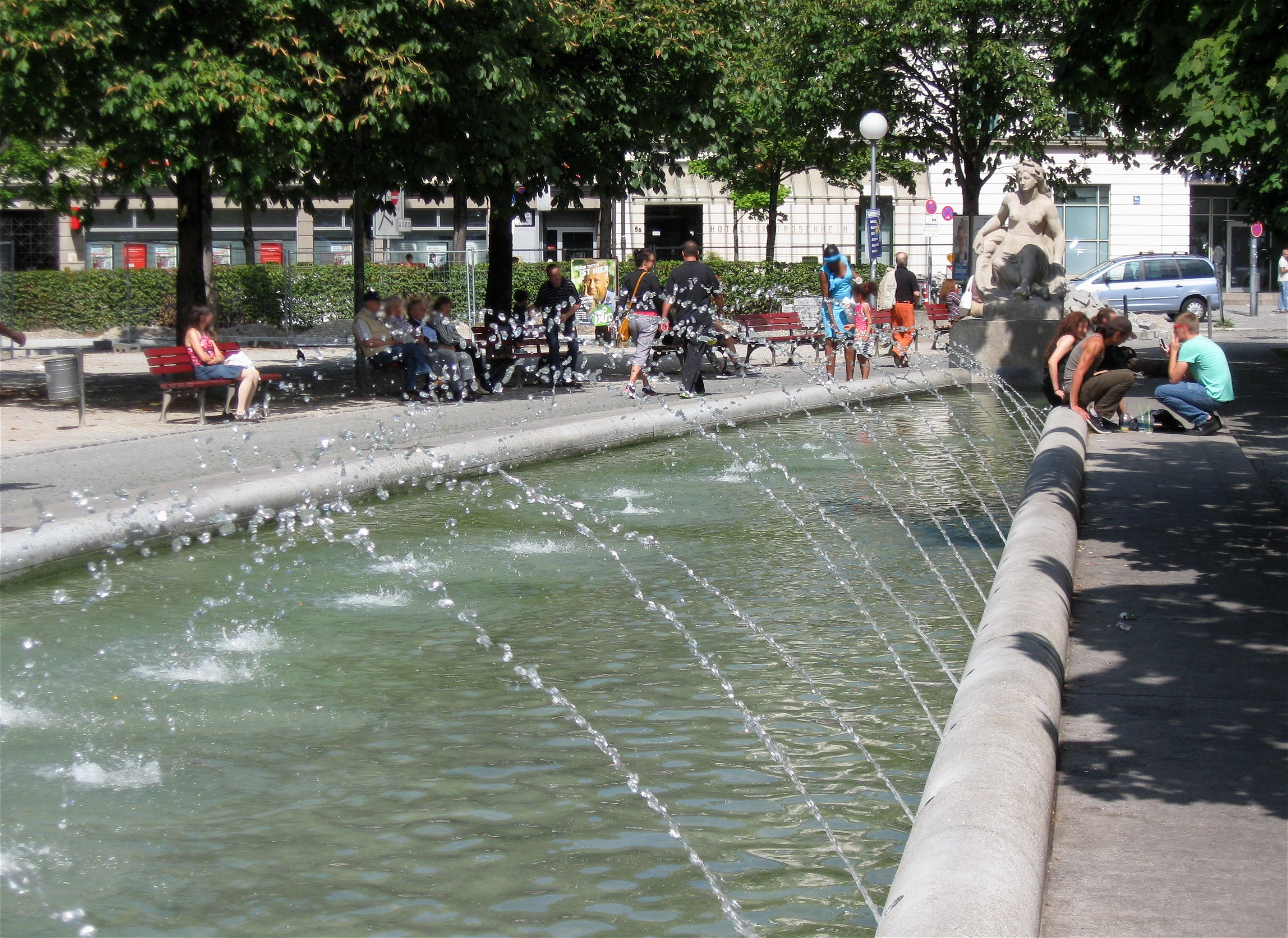
Fountain at Orleansplatz (2013)

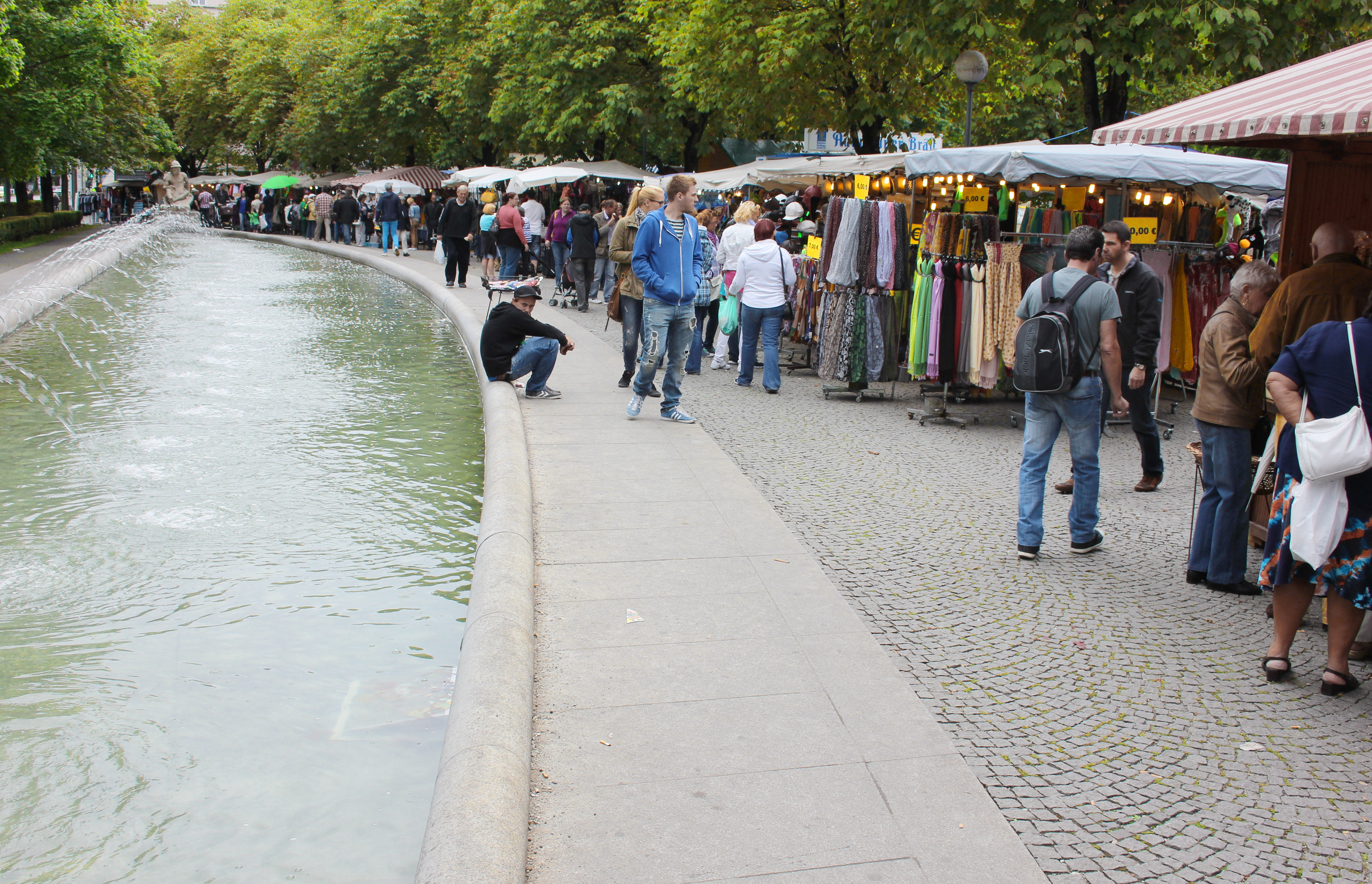
„Bayernmarkt“ at Orleansplatz (2013)
