= Axel Meise =

German designer and entrepreneur

- Born: 13 November 1962 (age 63); Düsseldorf
- Occupation: Founder of Occhio

Axel Meise (born November 13, 1962) is a German entrepreneur and designer. Meise is the founder and chief designer of Occhio, a lighting and design company based in Germany.

== Personal life ==
Meise was born in Düsseldorf, and started studying mechanical engineering at the Technical University in Munich in 1982. During these studies, Meise sold a light fixture which he had designed. In 1987, Meise presented a low-voltage system of his own design at a trade fair.

Meise is the father of two sons and lives in Starnberg with his wife Susann Meise (born 1964), who is part of Occhio's management. He received several awards for his designs, including the Red Dot Design Award and the iF Product Design Award.

== Career ==
In 1990, Meise founded Axel Meise Licht GmbH. He acquired a light gallery in Munich's Haidhausen and began producing his own lamp designs. A year later, Meise decided to sell the company.

In 1998, Axel Meise and physicist Christoph Kügler developed the modular Occhio (Italian for "eye") product family. The following year, Meise established Occhio GmbH in Munich and introduced Puro, the company's first product line. Subsequently, he founded Axelmeiselicht in 2000 as the distributor of Occhio products.

In 2004 Occhio introduced the Sento lamp series, designed by Meise, which was more powerful and had a more versatile design compared to the Puro line.

With the ban on incandescent light bulbs and halogen lamps in 2009, and Occhio's subsequent transition to LED technology, Meise established his own electronics department. In 2010, he introduced Più, a recessed and surface-mounted spotlight system based on the Sento series, incorporating the new LED technology. In 2012, Meise developed the three-dimensional moving luminaire series, Io.

In 2014, Meise presented a version of the Sento series with LED, which had infinitely variable light control. In 2017 the investment company EMH Partners became a partner of Meise, acquiring a 44 percent share in Occhio.

Also in 2017, Meise developed the Mito series in both ceiling and pendant versions, with touch-free gesture control operation. In 2020, Benno Zerlin was appointed as the new co-CEO of Occhio, focusing on operational tasks within the company while Meise concentrated on design and strategy. Two years later, Meise designed Gioia, a series of desk luminaires with adjustable light focus.
