= Weißenburger Platz =

Square in Munich, Germany

Coordinates: 48.128546°N 11.596171°E

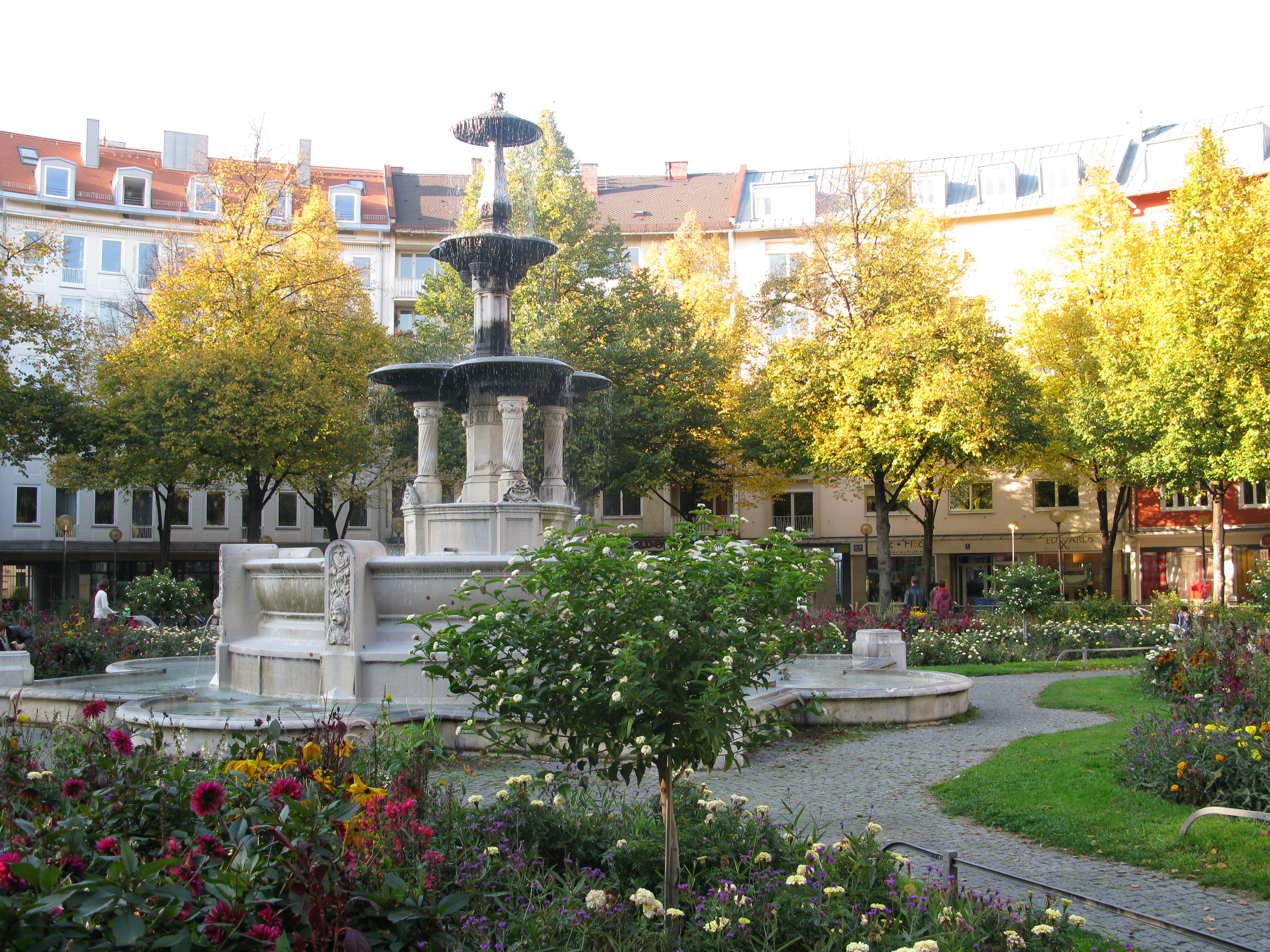
The glass palace fountain in the middle of Weißenburger Platz at night

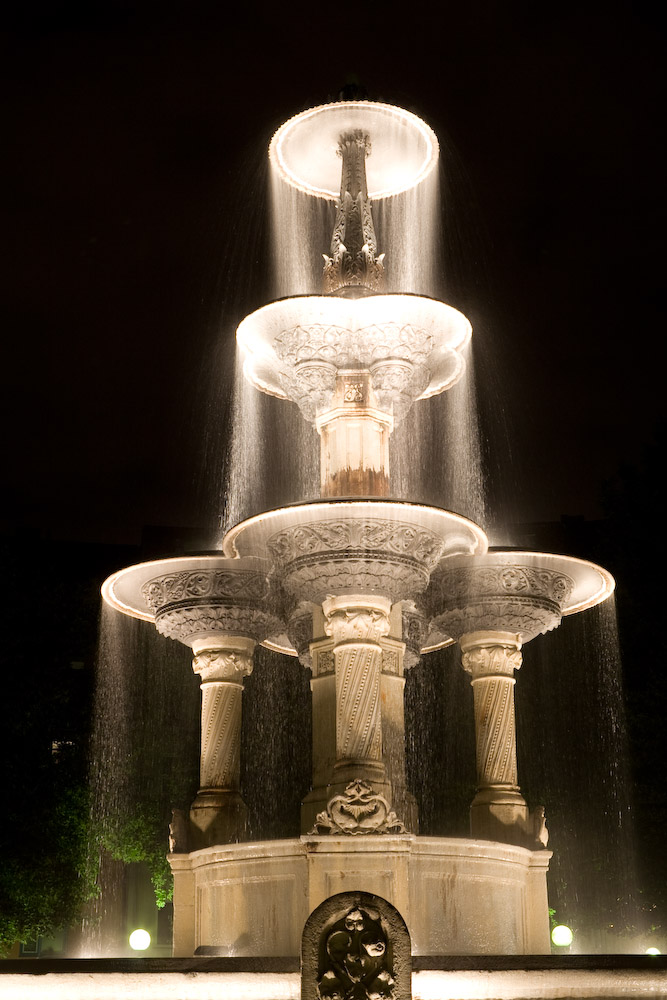
The glass palace fountain in the middle of Weißenburger Platz at night

Weißenburger Platz is a square in Munich's Franzosenviertel (French Quarters) in the Haidhausen district. In the middle of the concentrically arranged square is the Glaspalast-Brunnen (glass palace fountain), designed by August von Voit in 1853. This was initially located in the Glaspalast in the Alter Botanischer Garten - hence the name. At the end of the 19th century the fountain was moved to Orleansplatz. When the Ostbahnhof (East Train Station) there was rebuilt, the Glaspalast-Brunnen had to make room and was moved to the nearby Weißenburger Platz. After dusk the fountains water feature is illuminated.

Around the Glaspalast-Brunnen there are flowerbeds, which are planted several times a year. This circular green space is framed by a row of trees, under which benches are placed, and a ring-shaped street, which is partly a pedestrian zone. Five streets run towards Weißenburger Platz in the shape of a star: Metzstraße and Weißenburger Straße on both sides, and Lothringer Straße, where the municipal art gallery Lothringer13 is located near the square. In the buildings surrounding Weißenburger Platz there are various shops, restaurants, a pharmacy and a medical centre.

Since 1976, Weißenburger Platz has hosted a Christmas market that has grown steadily over the years. Nowadays, the Weißenburger Platz is being overbuilt with over 60 stands for the Christmas market, which takes place annually from the end of November until Christmas.

The name and design of the French Quarter have a historical background: When this quarter was created in 1872 after the German victory in the Franco-Prussian War (1870/1871), the planners decided to create squares and streets according to the French model. Therefore, the streets run towards the squares in a star shape. At the same time, they got their names from places where German armies won battles during the Franco-Prussian War. The Battle of Weissenburg gave its name to this square. Here the French army suffered a defeat in 1870. Today the small town in Alsace is no longer called Weißenburg but Wissembourg.
