= Balanstraße =

Street in Munich, Germany

The Balanstraße is a street in Munich which begins at the Rosenheimer Platz and runs in a southerly direction through the districts Haidhausen, Giesing and Ramersdorf to the district of Fasangarten. It ends at the border road directly on the city boundary to the municipality Neubiberg in the district of Munich.

== Description ==
The Balanstraße is, except for a small section between the Rosenheimer Platz and the Metzstraße where it is a one-way street about 30 m long, passable in both directions with one lane in each direction. Between Fasangartenstraße and Grenzstraße it only has one lane for both directions.

Bicycle paths run almost continuously along it.

== History ==
The street was named in 1880 after the French town of Balan near Sedan in the Ardennes. Where in 1870, the Battle of Sedan (Prussia v. France) took place, in which regiments of the Bavarian army alongside of Prussia took part. Since 1867, its previous official name was "Irrenweg" because of the Kreisirrenanstalt Munich located there since 1859 (until 1900, since 1919 it is the Salesianum for disadvantaged young people). After several residents had successfully protested against the streets name, it was renamed in favor of "glorious memories for the Bavarian army, especially for the Munich Regiments".

== Road access ==
The stop Balanstraße at the "Mittlerer Ring" serves the bus lines 59, 139 and 145. The line 59 crosses the Balanstraße. The line 139 comes from the Chiemgaustraße ("Mittlerer Ring") onto the Balanstraße in the southern direction and leaves it again on the Hochäckerstraße. The line 145 comes from the Claudius-Keller-Straße and follows the Balanstraße to Fasangartenstraße. Line 54 departs from Orleansstraße onto Balanstraße and follows it to Werinherstraße. Slightly different from the daily lines are the associated night bus lines.

== Public facilities ==
- Chamber of Commerce and Industry for Munich and Upper Bavaria on Balanstraße 55 to 59
- Integrative Montessori School on Balanstraße 73 (German Engagement Award 2015)
- Daycare, Hort and elementary school (the elementary school was also a secondary school until 1996) on Balanstraße 153, 1960 by architect Harald Roth
- Municipal vocational school for vocational preparation at Balanstraße 208

== Historical buildings ==
On the Balanstraße are mainly residential buildings. The house numbering goes to number 395.

There are fourteen historical buildings in the northern part of Balanstraße:

- House number 4, around 1890 to 1900, Neo-Baroque
- House number 11, around 1870 to 1880
- House number 12, built between 1890 and 1900, it houses the restaurant Simplicissimus of the Augustiner-Bräu
- House number 14, around 1900; notice the two bay windows
- House number 15, around 1870 to 1880
- House number 16, around 1900, Schweifgiebel, corner Rablstraße, in it is the tavern KlinglWirt of Löwen and Paulaner-Bräus
- House number 17, early 1900
- House number 19 and 21, around 1890, Neo-Baroque
- House number 23, together with Pariser Strasse 1, around 1898, Neo-Baroque, founding site of the Münchner Kleinkunstbühne Theater Drehleier by Beppi Bachmair, Uwe Kleinschmidt and Werner Winkler from 1976 to 1997
- House number 29, around 1890 to 1900, Neo-Baroque
- House numbers 33 and 35, around 1890 to 1900, Neo-Baroque
- House number 47, corner house, from 1895

At the Balanstraße 20, corner Barnabasstraße, stands the tower of the original parish church of St. Wolfgang by Hans Schurr (1920).

In 1963, Klaus Backmund designed a fish fountain in front of Balanstraße 73.

The church of Isaiah in Obergiesing from 1966 has the number 361.

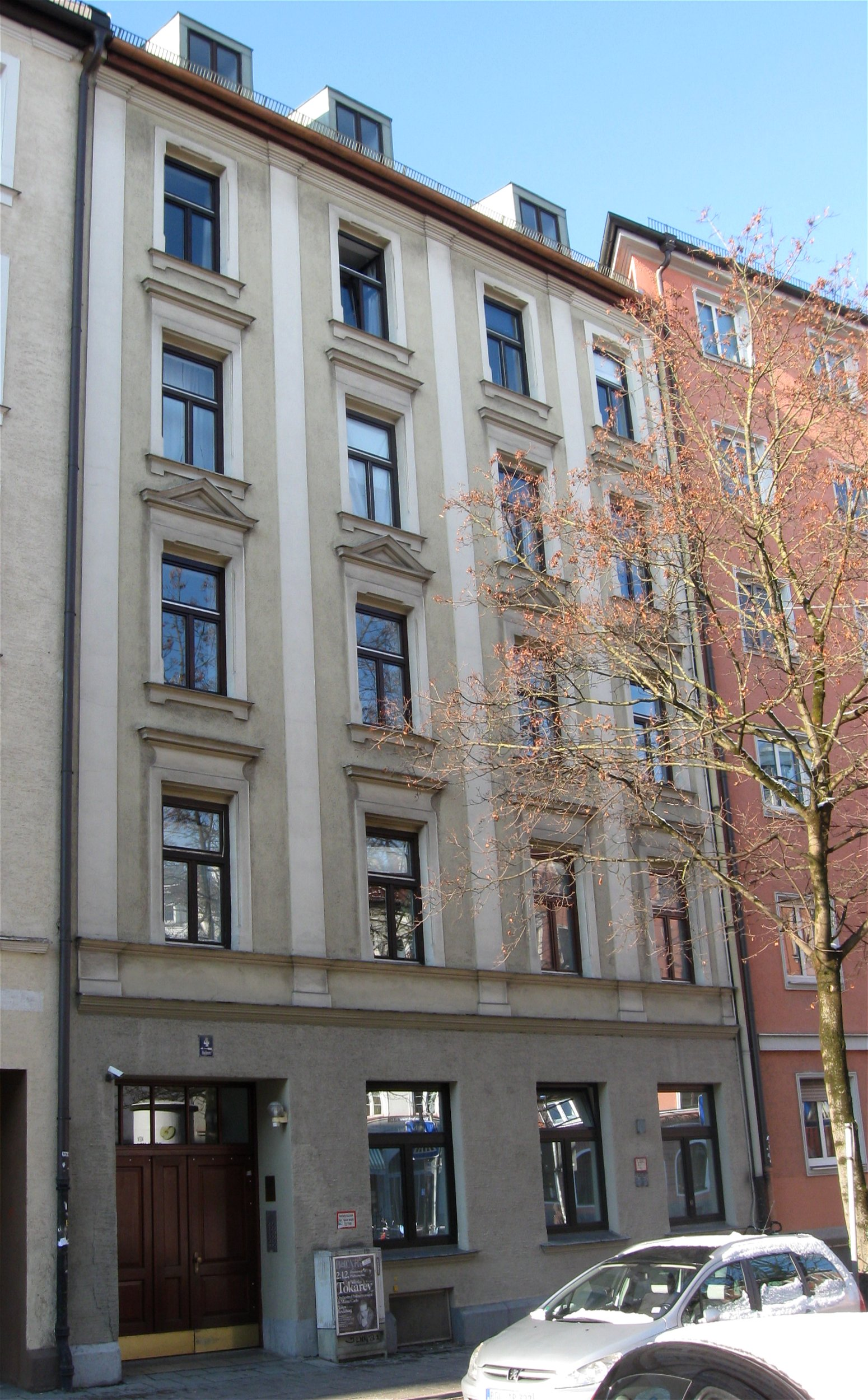
Balanstraße 4

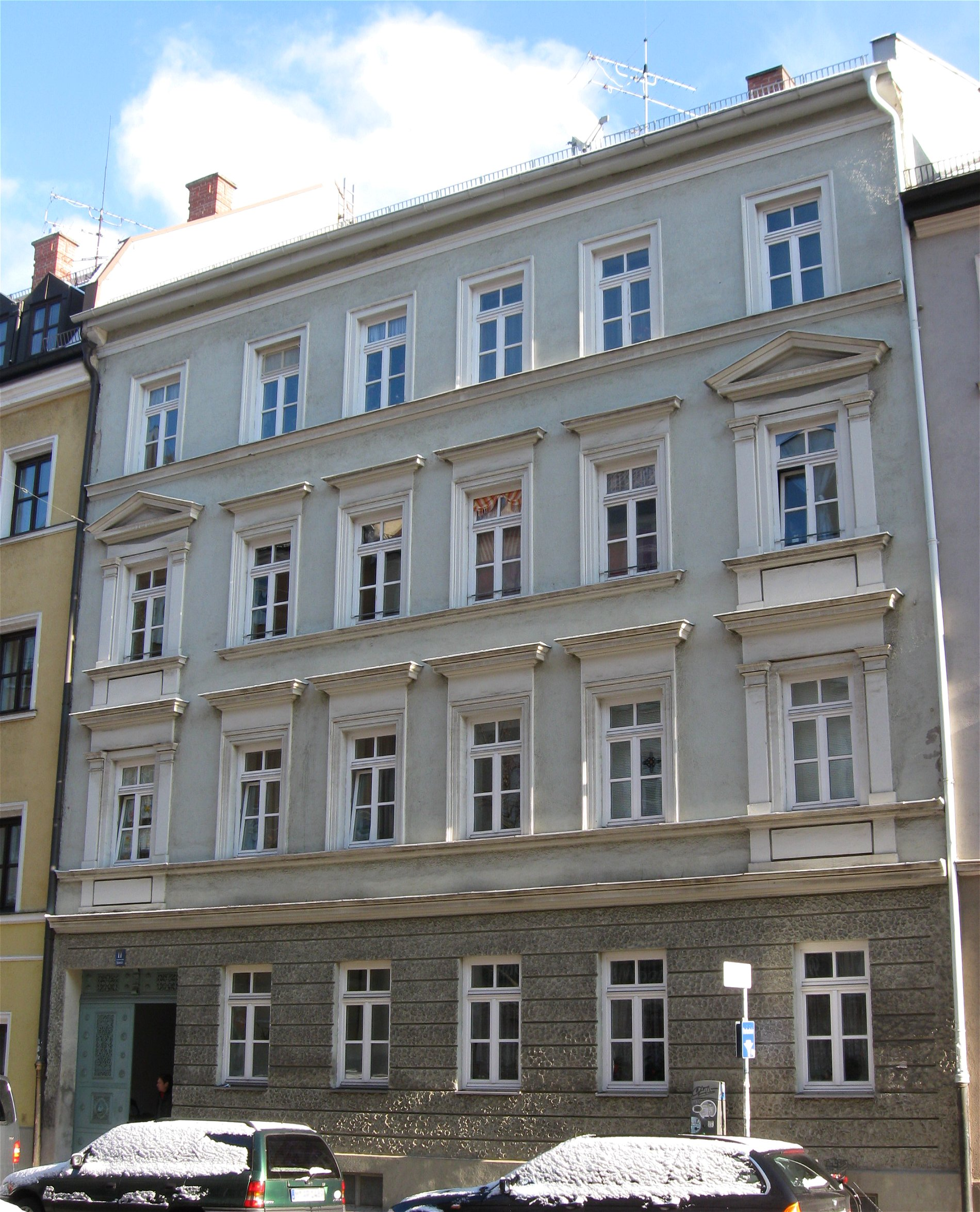
Balanstraße 11

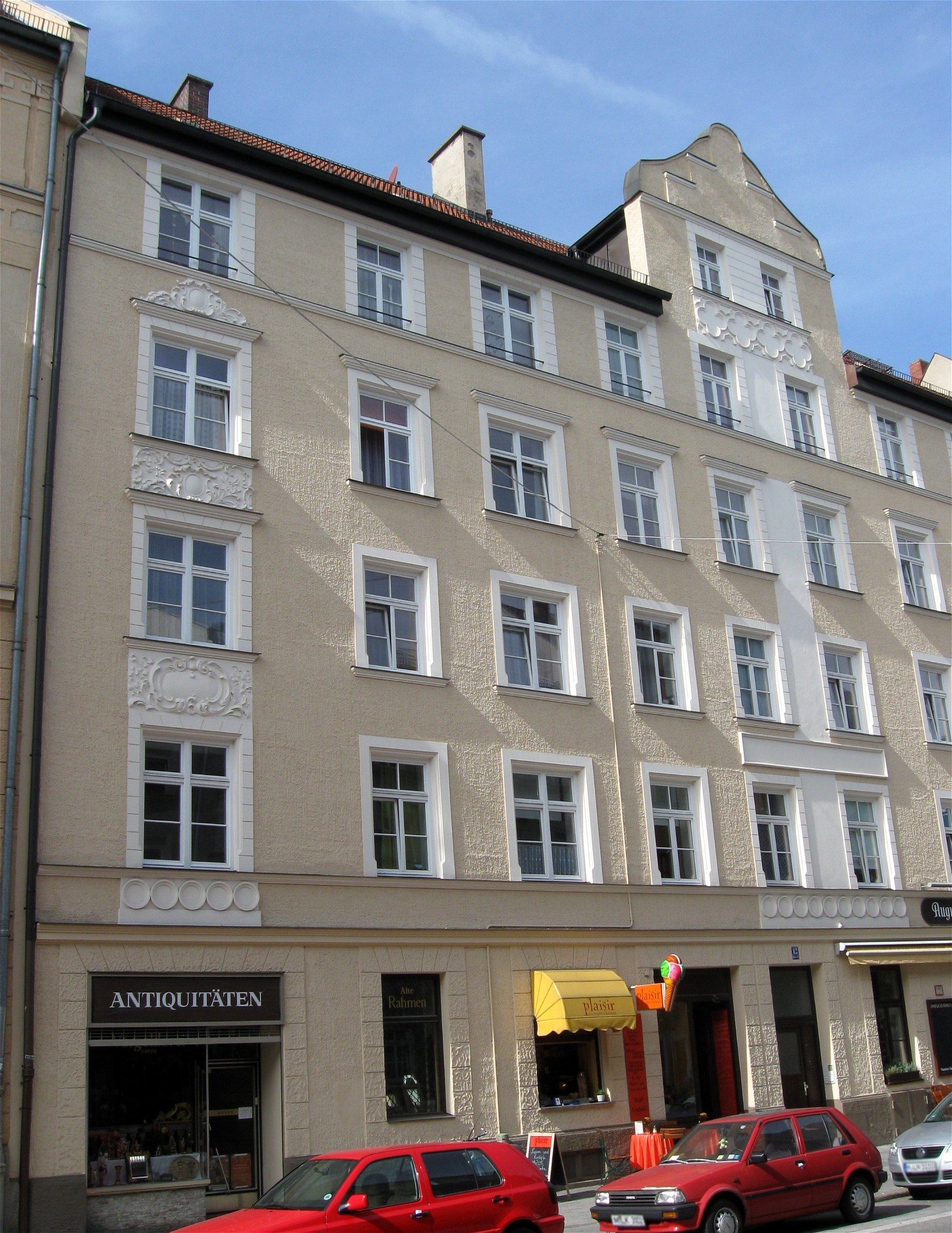
Balanstraße 12

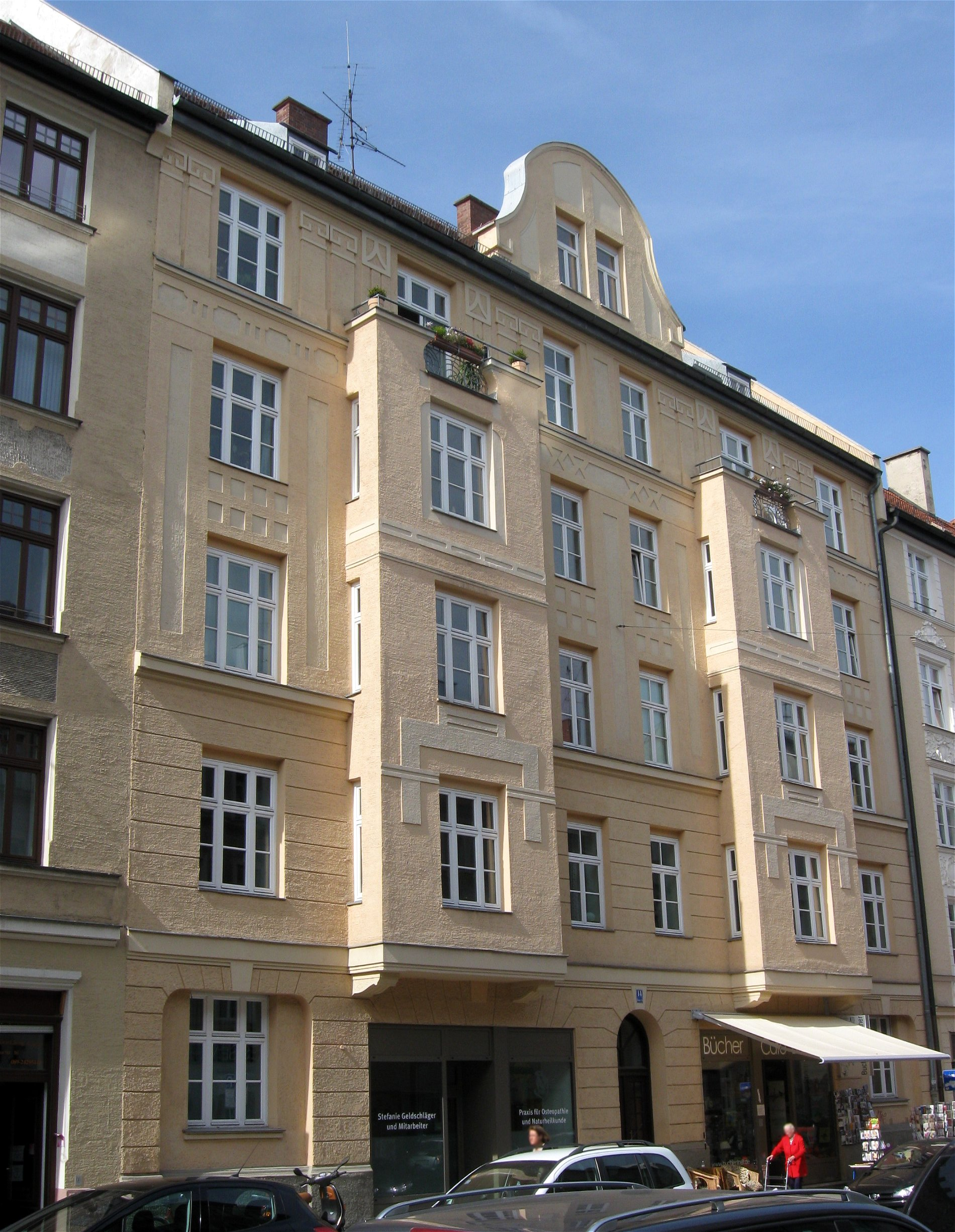
Balanstraße 14

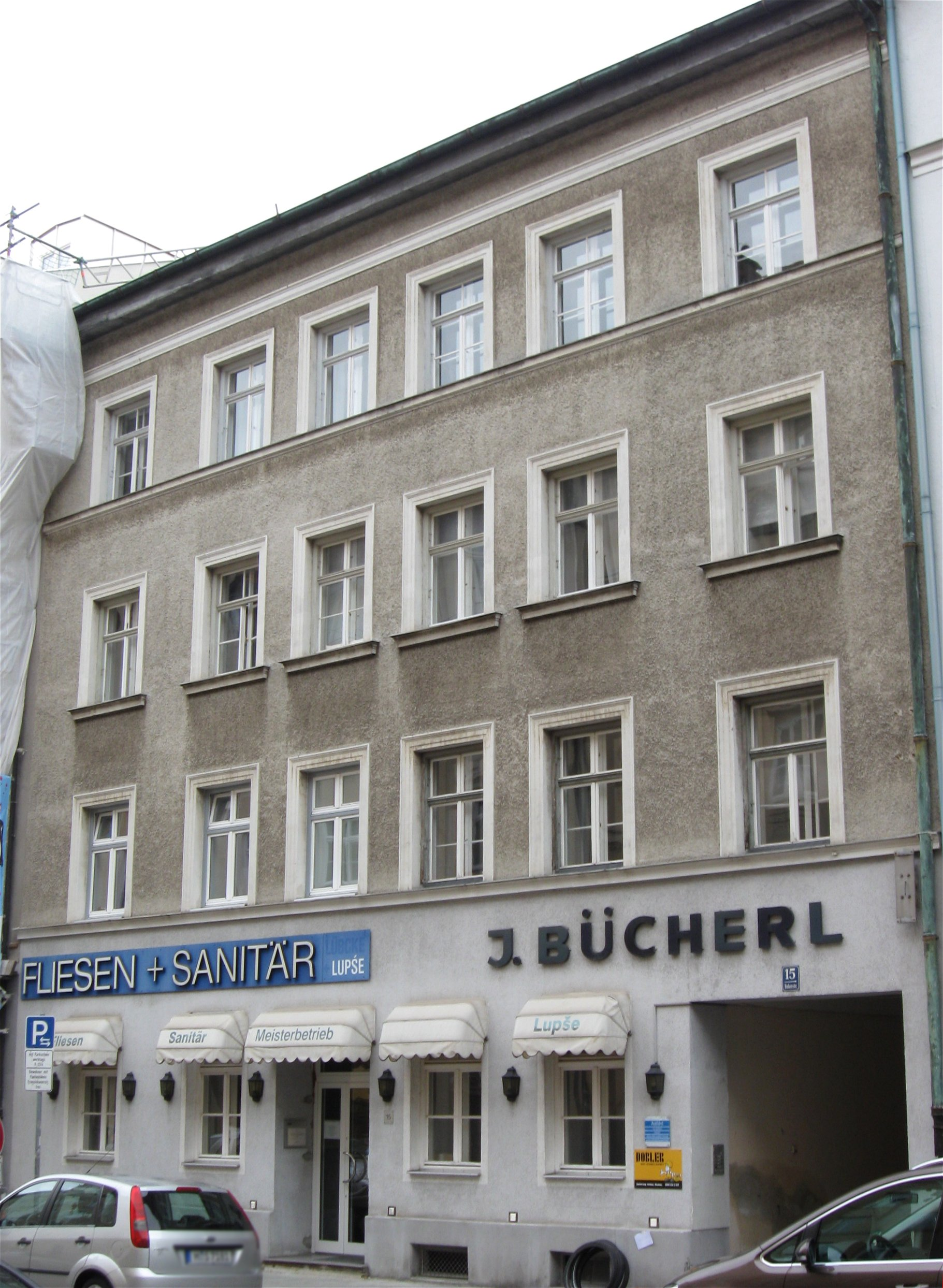
Balanstraße 15

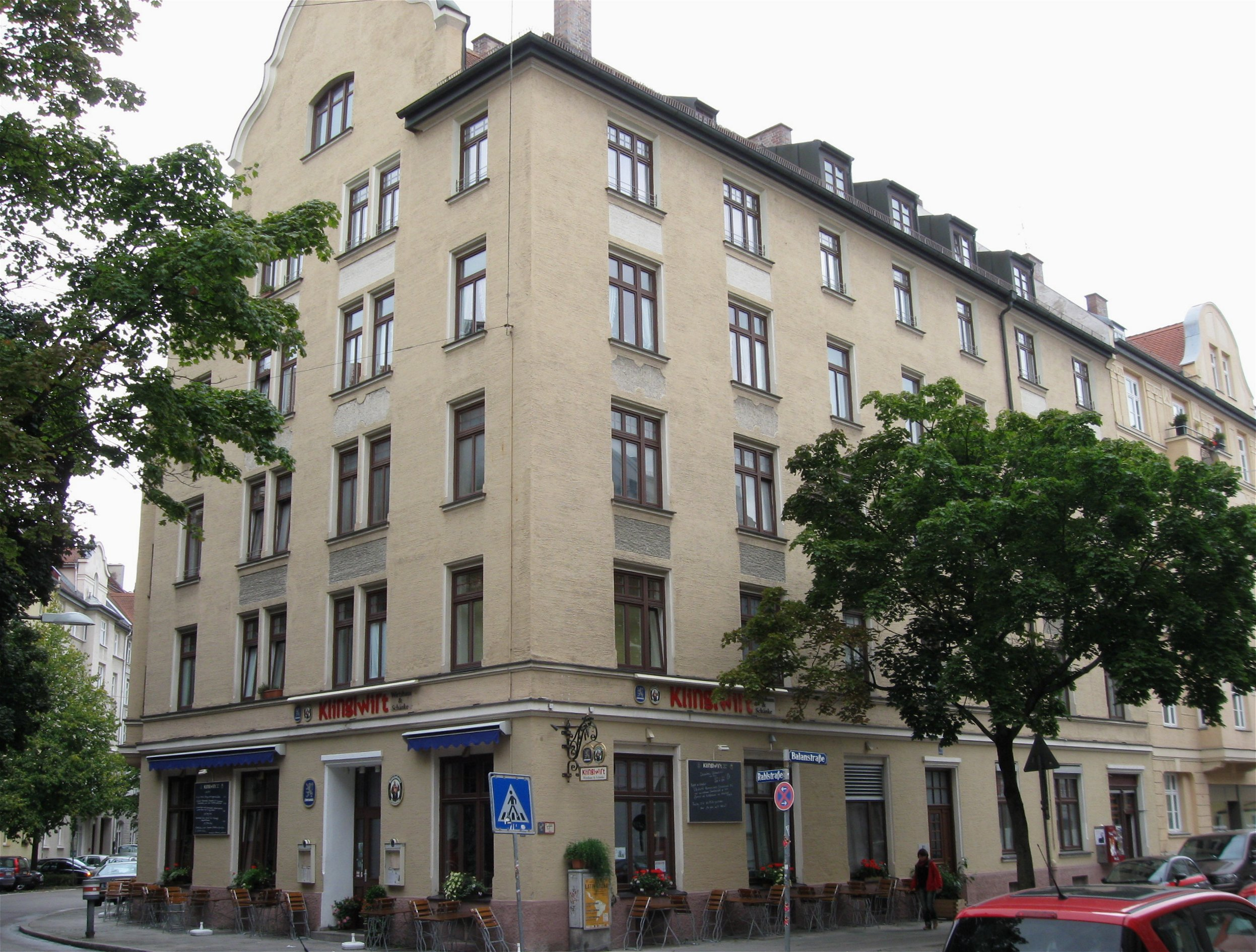
Balanstraße 16

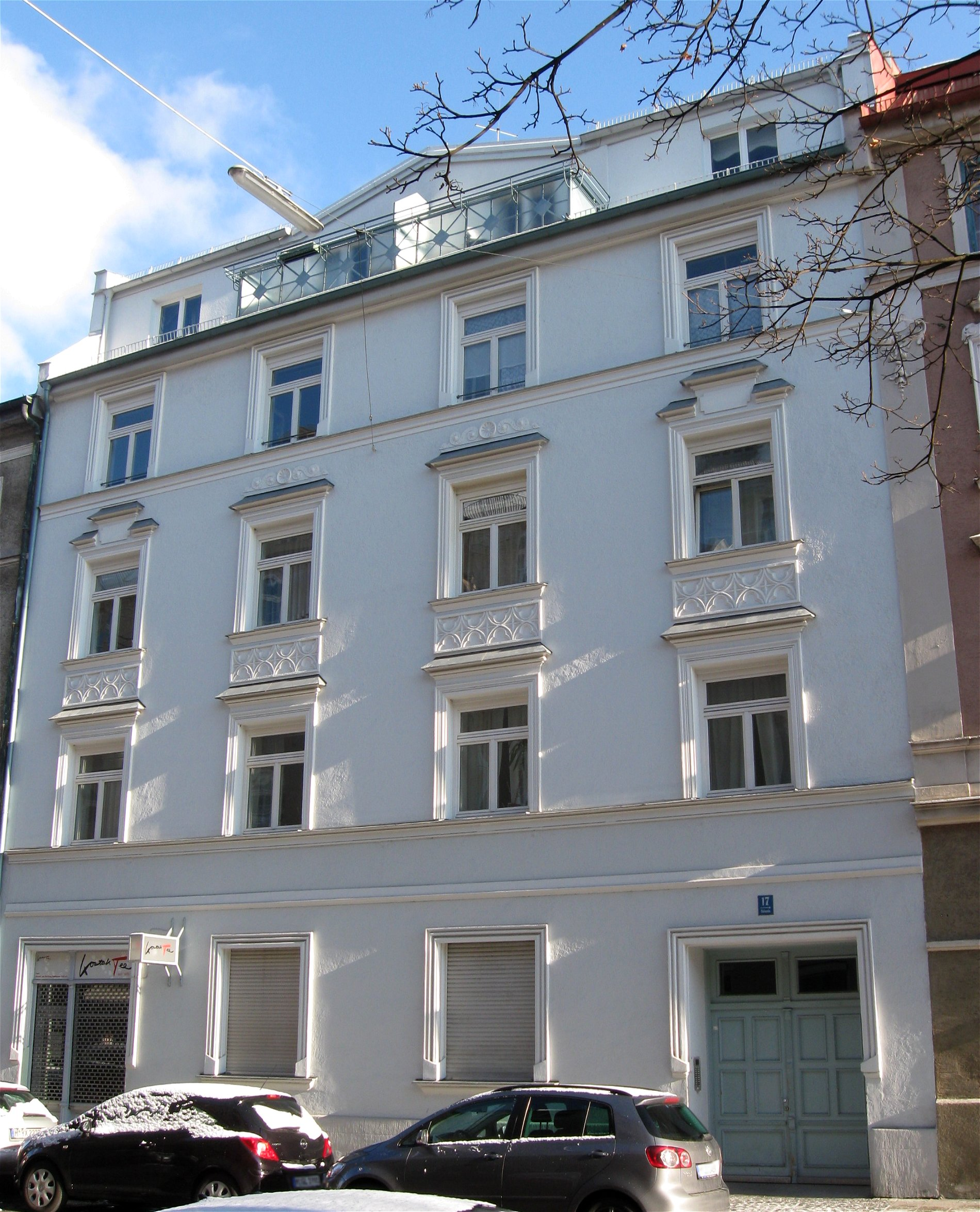
Balanstraße 17

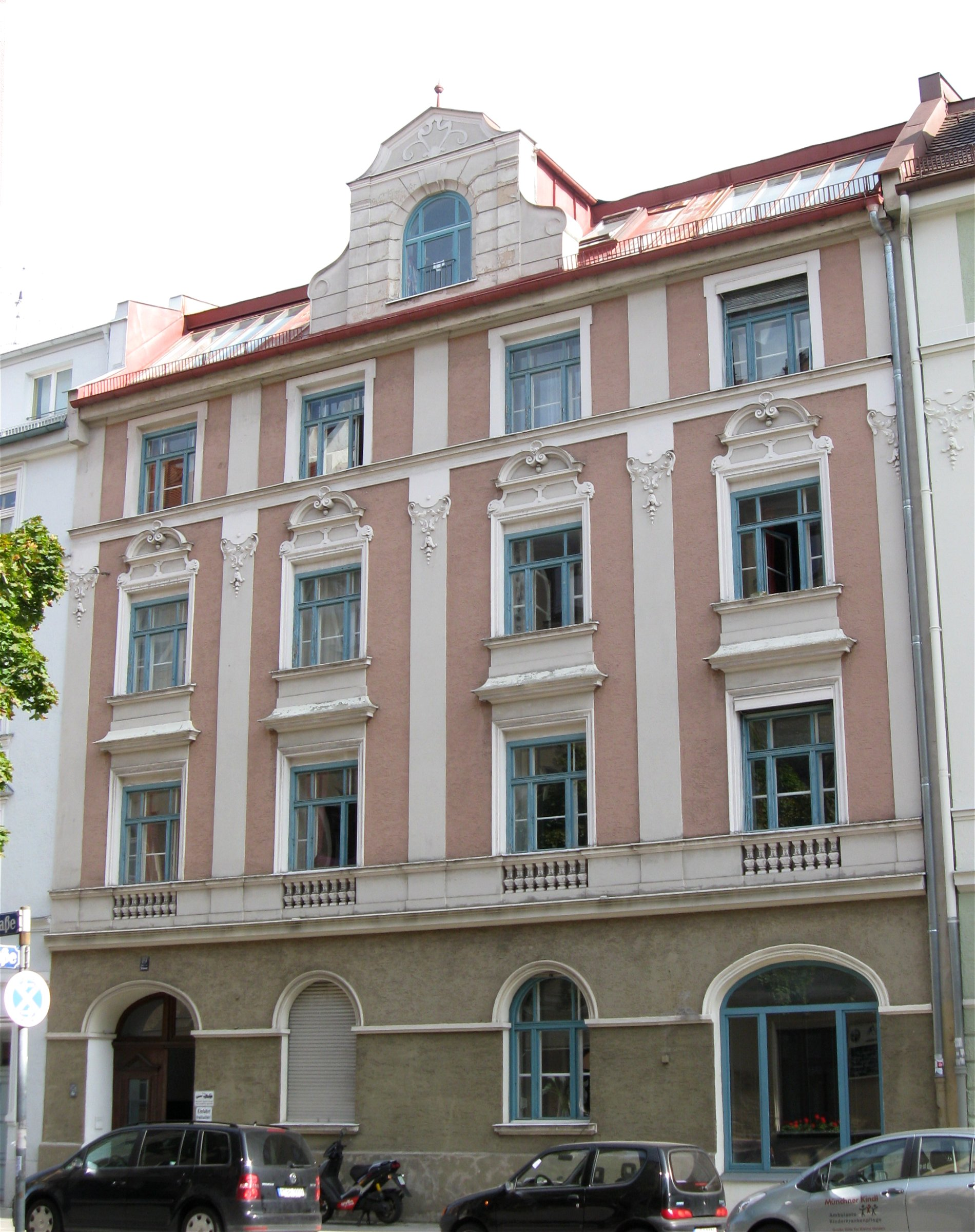
Balanstraße 19

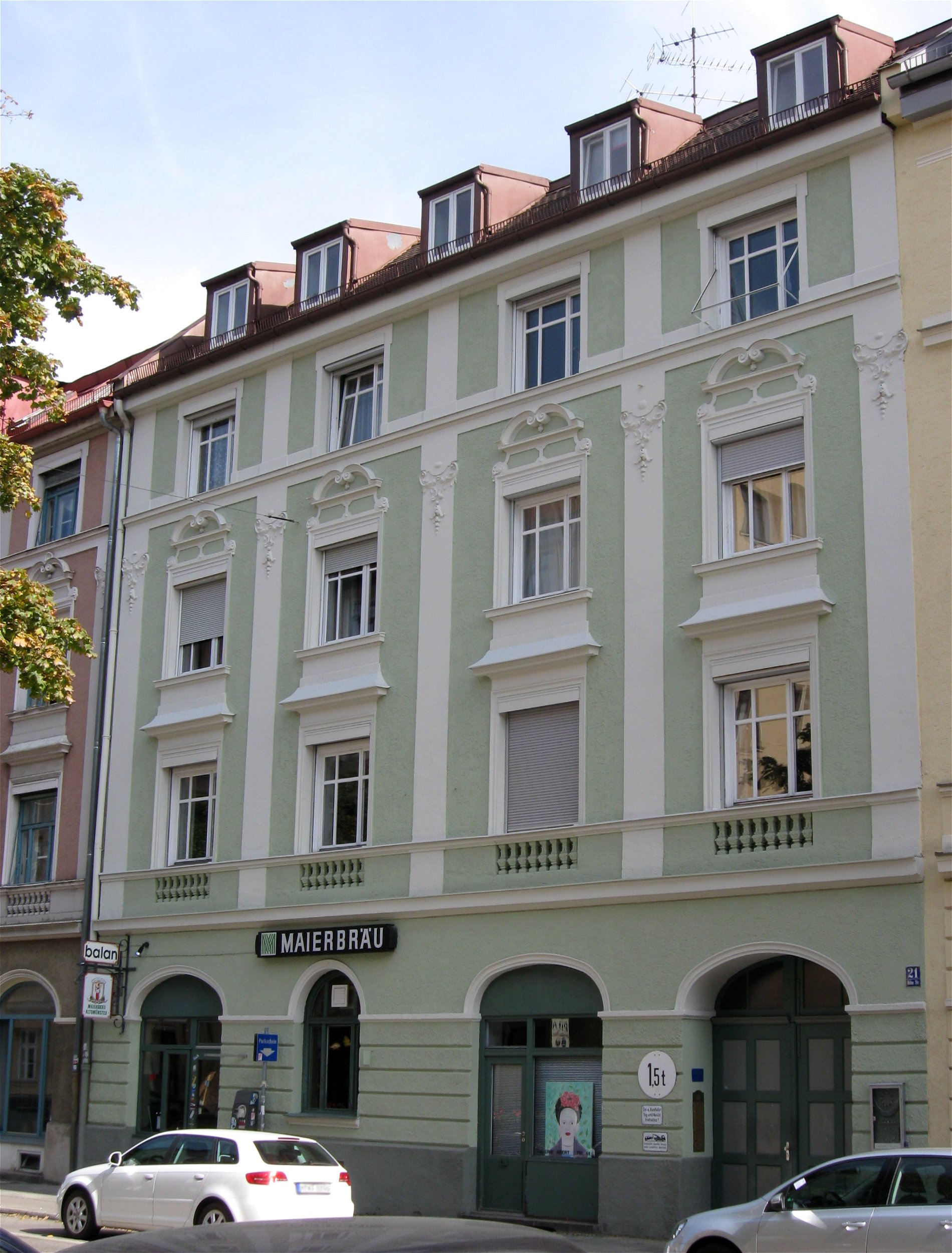
Balanstraße 21

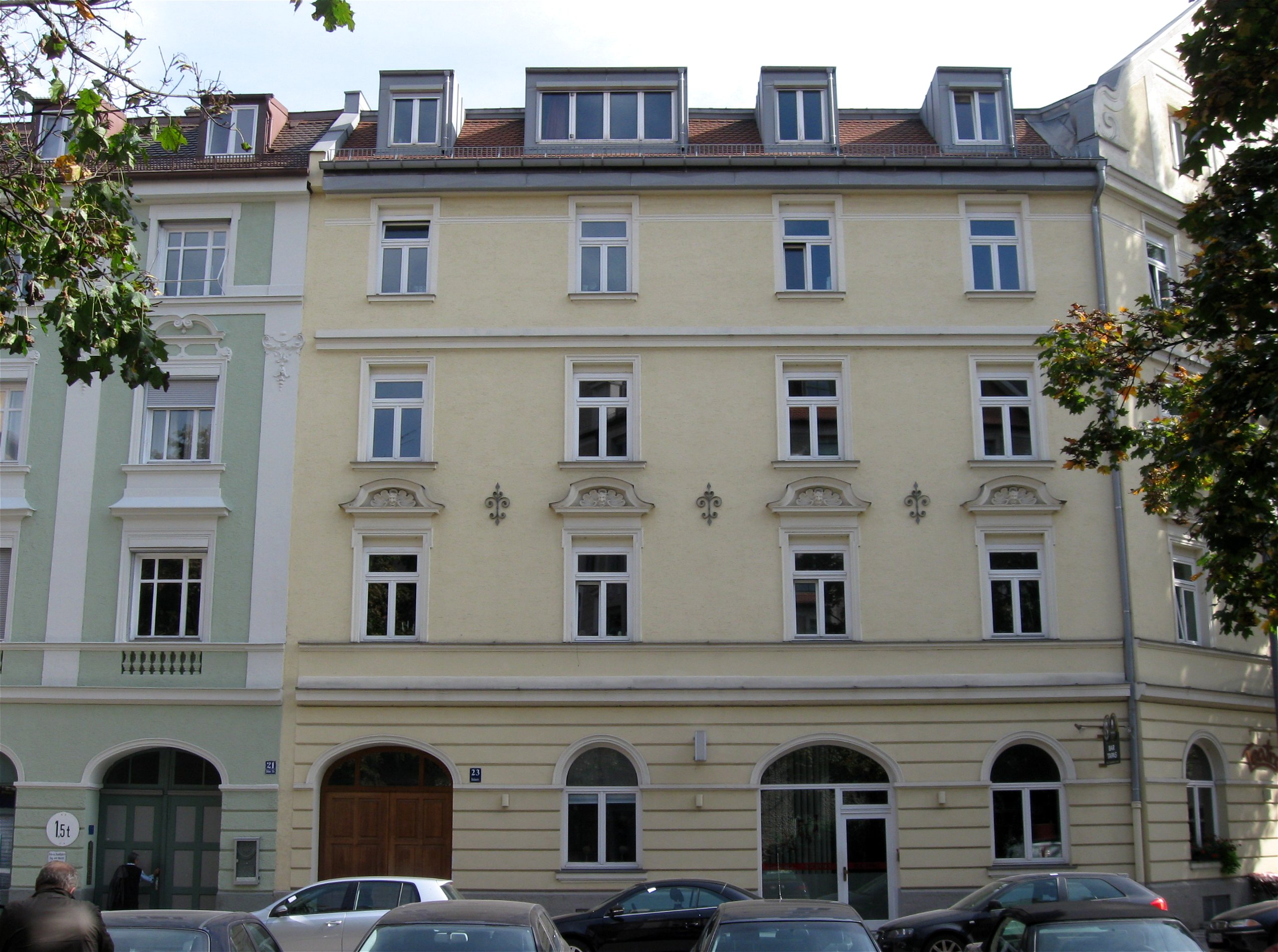
Balanstraße 23

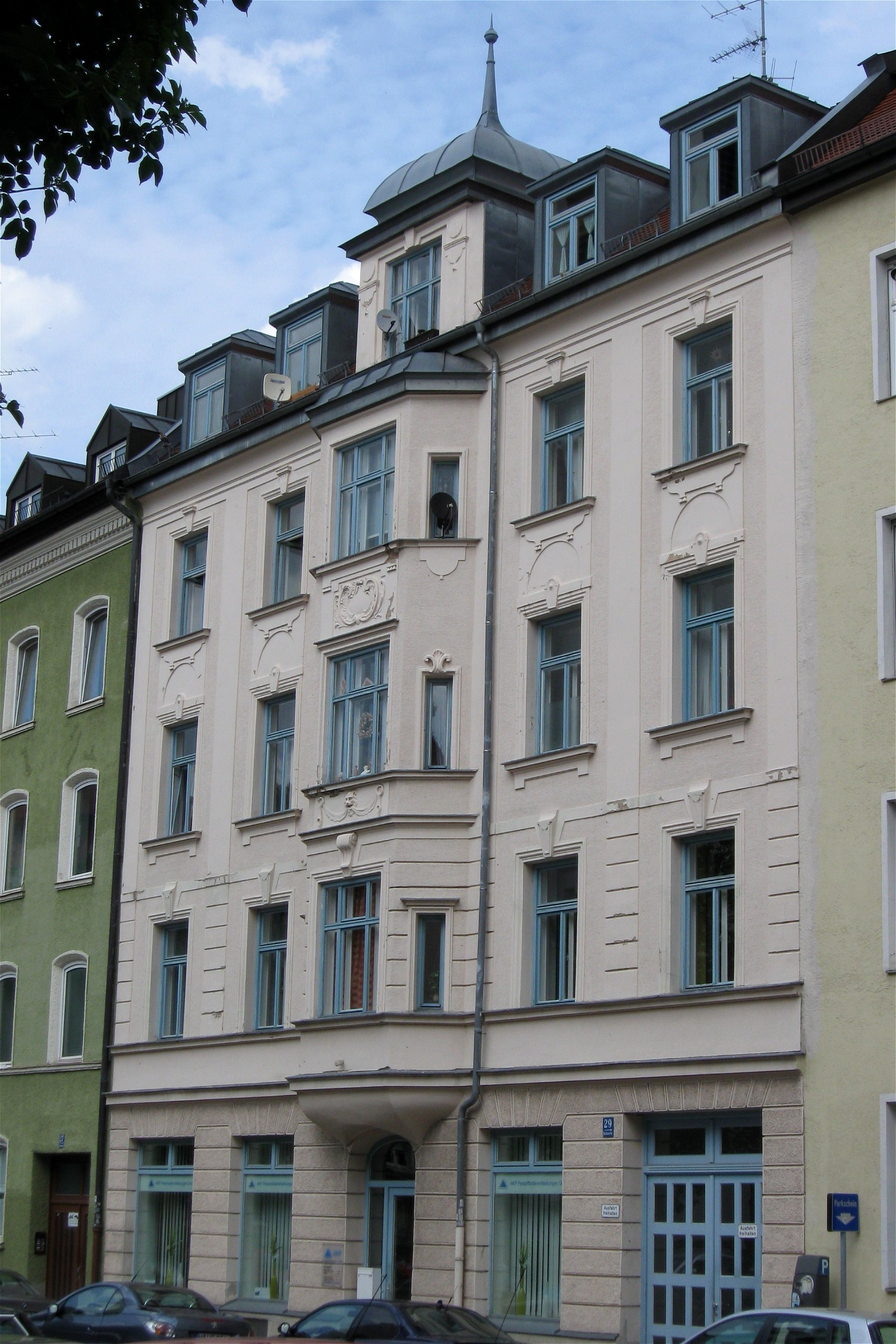
Balanstraße 29

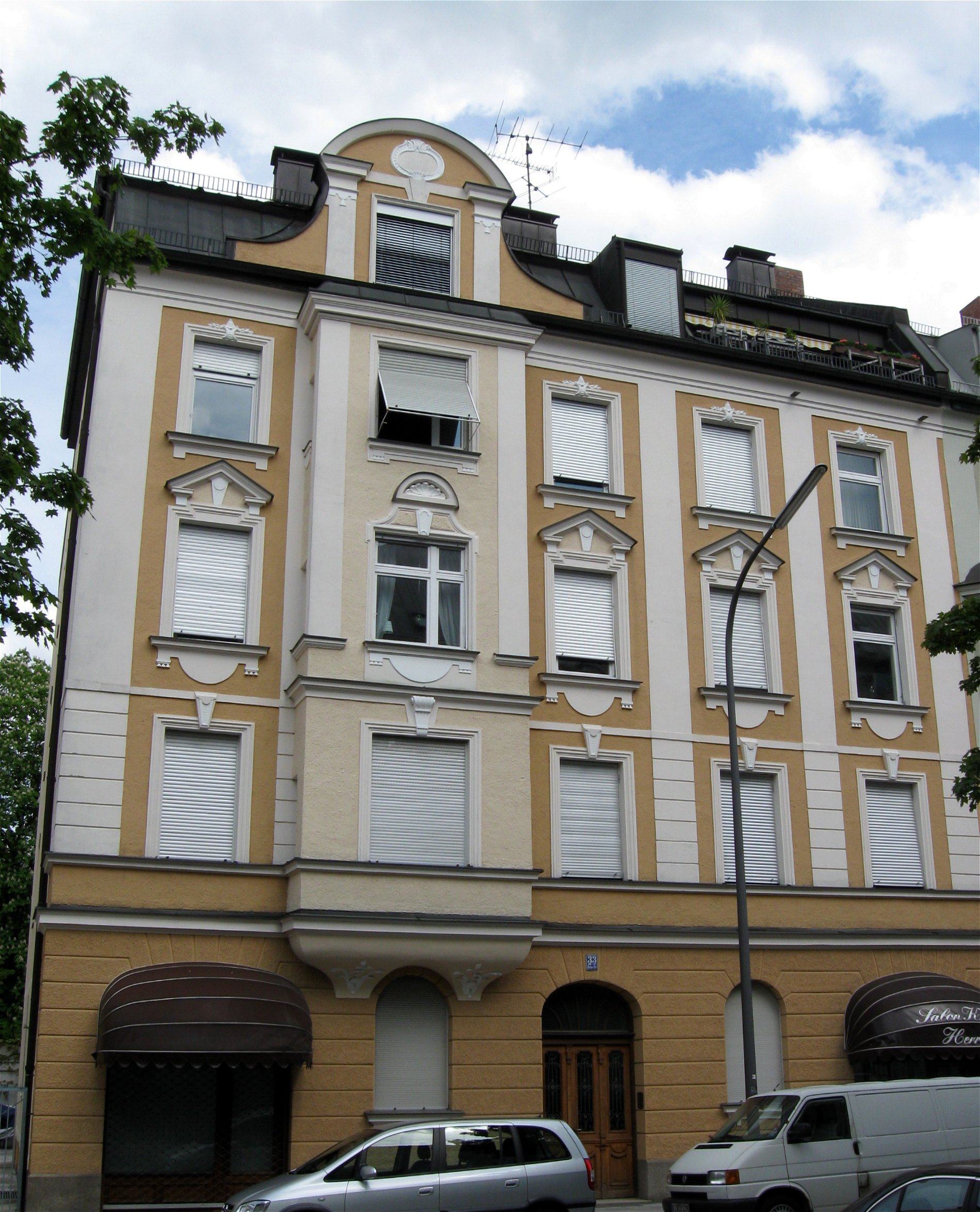
Balanstraße 33

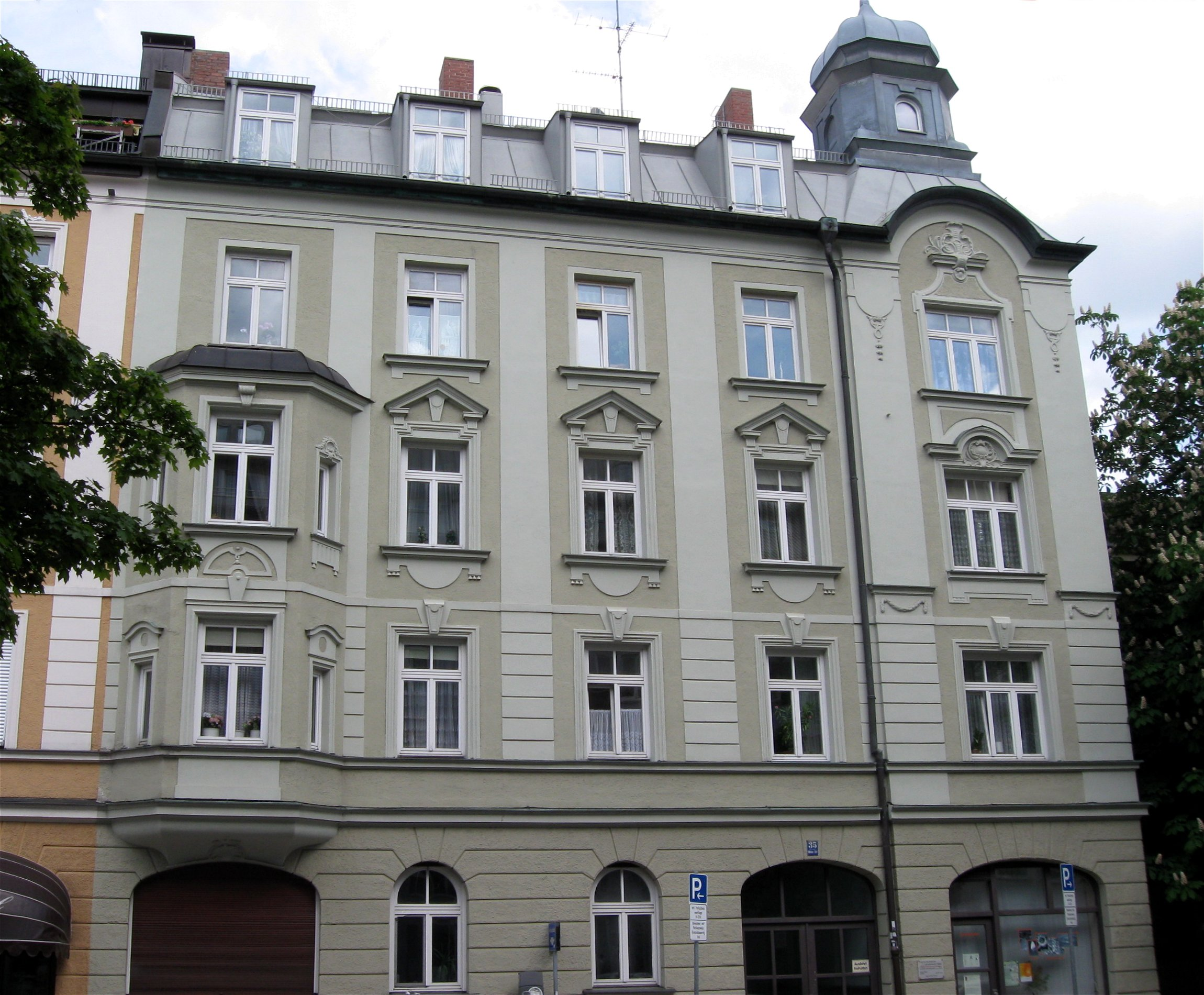
Balanstraße 35

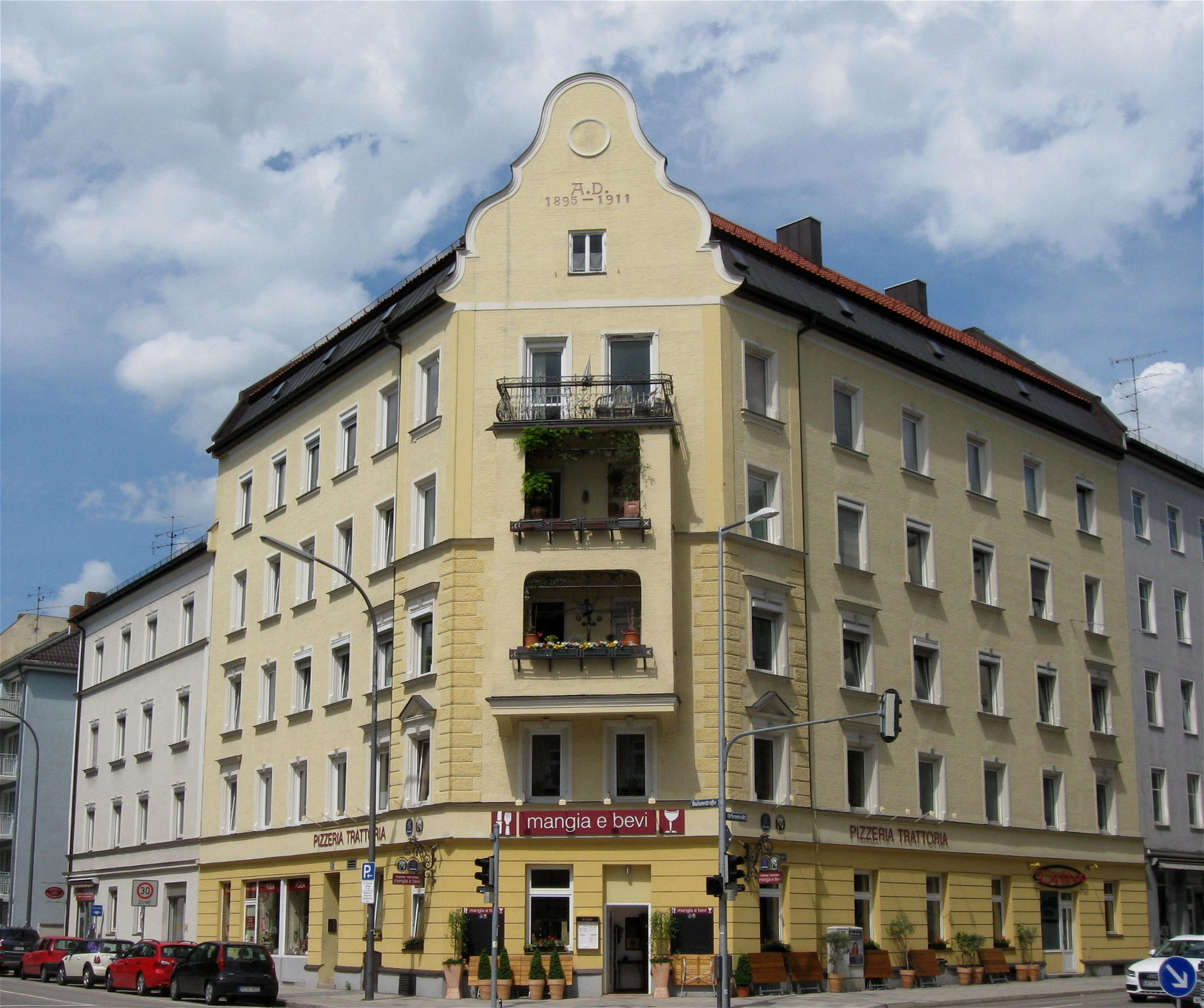
Balanstraße 47

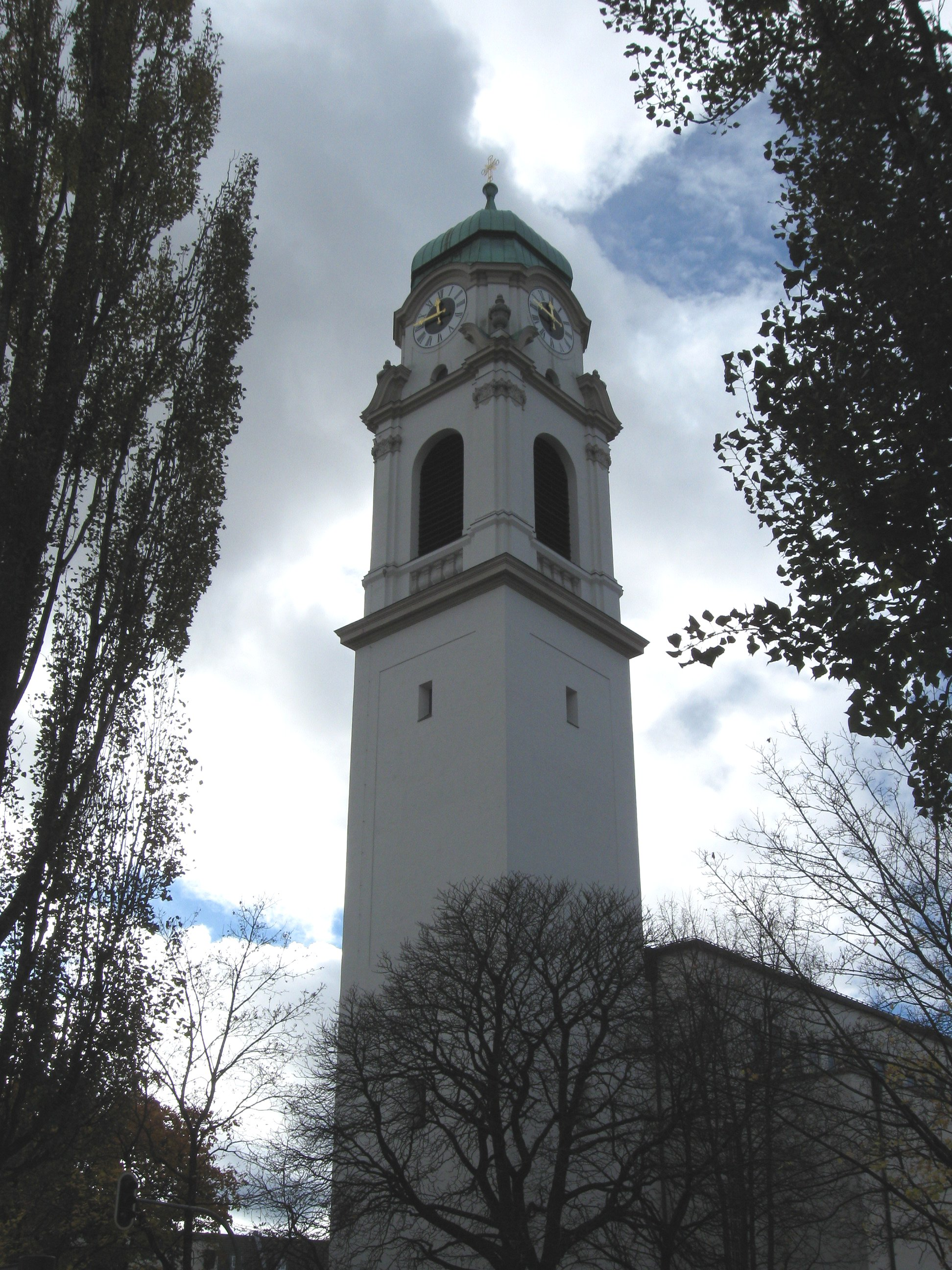
Tower of the original parish church on Balanstraße 20

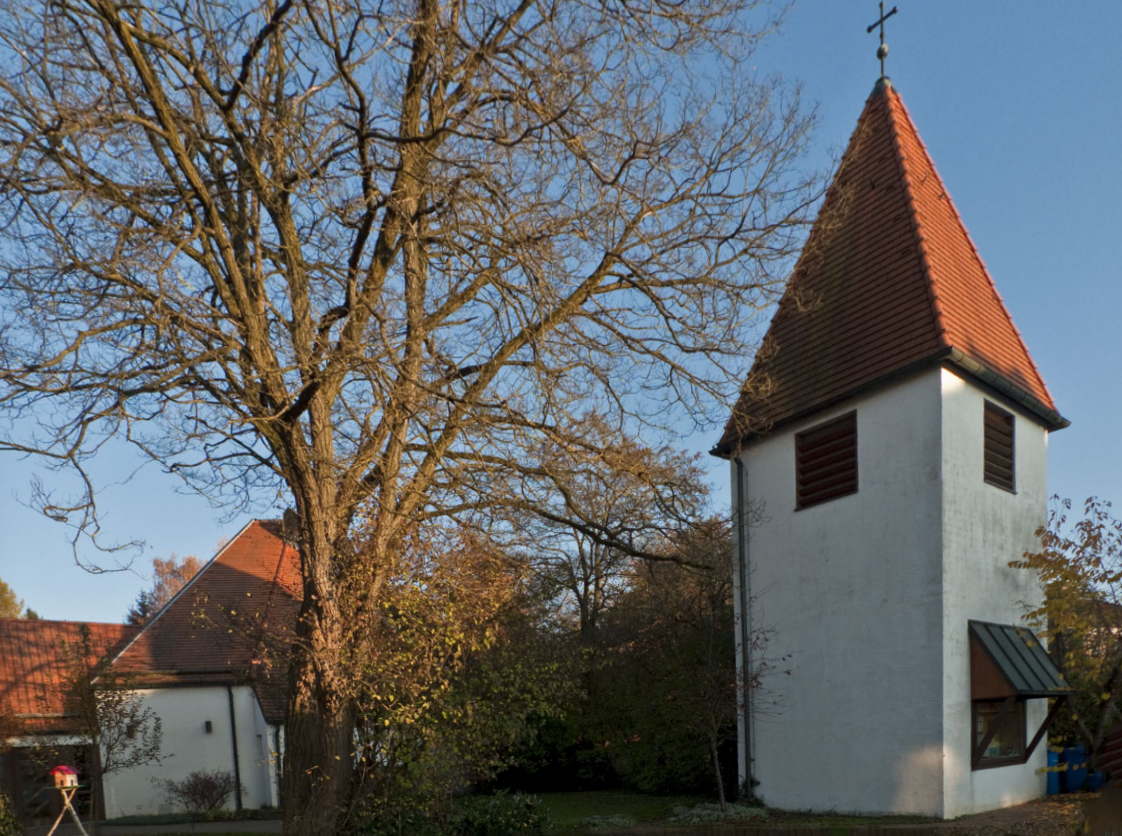
Isaiah Church Obergiesing, Balanstraße 361

== Various ==
The street is eponymous for the district Balanstraße West in the district of Ramersdorf-Perlach, which is also referred to as Ramersdorf South or Nußdorf. The district is bounded in the west and south by the route of the S-Bahn line to Kreuzstraße. There, the Balanstraße crosses the S-Bahn at a limited level crossing.

The television series Die Hausmeisterin, which was produced in three seasons with a total of 23 episodes, each 45 minutes long, for Bayerischer Rundfunk between 1987 and 1992 and was broadcast in the evening program of the Das Erste and in the third program of the Bavarian Television, it takes place in the old rental building on Balanstraße 19 in the Munich district Haidhausen.

The television series Polizeiinspektion 1 used the residential house Balanstraße 37 as a police station.
