= Occhio =

German manufacturer of lighting systems

Occhio GmbH
- Company type: GmbH
- Founded: 1999
- Headquarters: Munich, Germany
- Key people: Axel Meise; Susann Meise; Benno Zerlin
- Revenue: €104.6 million (2021/22)
- Number of employees: 183 (2022)
- Website: www.occhio.com

Occhio GmbH is a manufacturer of lighting and spotlight systems for residential and commercial applications based in Munich, Germany.

== History ==
Occhio was founded by Axel Meise in 1999, and launched its first product, the modular lighting system Puro. In 2004, the company introduced the Sento lighting system with options such as interchangeable optics and colour filters. An additional glass version, the Divo, was introduced in 2008.

The gradual ban on incandescent and halogen lamps in 2009 caused Occhio to switch to LED technology, and the company began to develop its own electronics. Occhio launched the Più series of recessed and surface-mounted lighting systems in 2010. In 2017, the company became a member of Meisterkreis Deutschland, an interest group representing 70 creative companies and scientific institutions. Also, Occhio launched the Mito luminaire series, which received a number of design awards.

In 2018, the investment company EMH acquired 44 percent of Occhio's shares.

In July 2020, Benno Zerlin became managing director of Occhio alongside Axel Meise; Susann Meise also became managing director in 2021. In 2022, Axel Meise stepped down from the management team. In 2022, Occhio presented the table and reading lamp Gioia, followed by the model Luna in 2023, a luminaire with adjustable brightness and light temperature.

== Corporate structure ==
Benno Zerlin and Susann Meise serve as managing directors of Occhio GmbH. Axel Meise is responsible for product, design, innovation and the Occhio brand. In 2021/22, the company had 183 employees and generated revenues of €104.6 million. The company headquarters are located Munich.

== Lighting systems ==
Occhio manufactures modular lighting systems for private and commercial spaces and buildings, including ceiling luminaires, room luminaires, pendant luminaires, arc luminaires and floor luminaires. The luminaires have functions such adjustable colour temperature or light colour, and, through a sync function, multiple luminaires can be controlled simultaneously. The company's lighting systems are sold in 500 stores in Europe as well as internationally.
