= Maria Rosenkranzkönigin =

Coordinates: 48°04′30″N 11°40′03″E

Maria Rosenkranzkönigin Mary, Our Lady of the Rosary
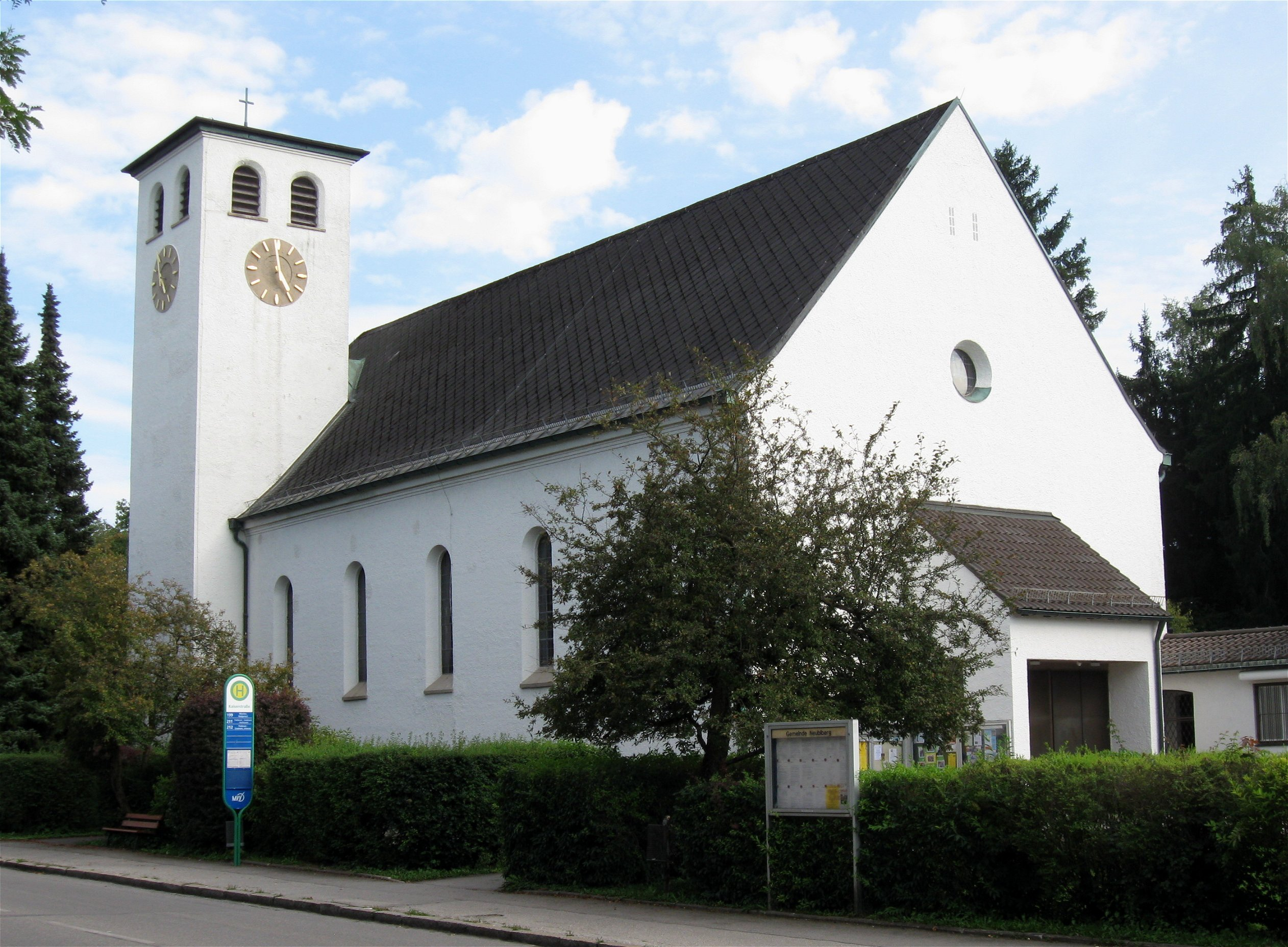
- Maria Rosenkranzkönigin

- Neubiberg, Bavaria Maria Rosenkranzkönigin (Germany)

General information
- Status: In use
- Type: Church
- Architectural style: Modern
- Location: Haupstraße, Neubiberg, Germany
- Elevation: 417 metres (1,368 ft)
- Inaugurated: 11 November 1928
- Owner: Roman Catholic Church

Height
- Architectural: 21.5 metres (71 ft)

Dimensions
- Circumference: 106.6 metres (350 ft)

Technical details
- Material: Rendered
- Floor area: Internal: 246.4 square metres (2,652 ft^{2}); External: 532 square metres (5,726 ft^{2})

Design and construction
- Architect: Franz Xaver Boemmel
- Main contractor: Metzger & Spörkl

Website
- Maria Rosenkranzkönigin

Maria Rosenkranzkönigin (English: "Our Lady of the Rosary" is a Roman Catholic parish church in the municipality of Neubiberg, near (Munich) in Bavaria. The church was built in 1928 using functional-modern forms of architecture. It was consecrated on November 11, 1928 by Michael Cardinal von Faulhaber.

== History ==
In 1911, urban development began in the woodland along the Munich-Kreuzstraße railway line. The growth of the new settlements was encouraged through advertising slogans such as Return to nature, in the forest you will find peace!. Neubiberg was promoted as the future garden city. As early as 1913, the first settlers erected a statue of the Blessed Virgin Mary, transferring it in 1921 to a newly‑consecrated chapel of Maria im Walde (The Chapel of St Mary of the Woods.) Today, it stands as a memorial church for the victims of the two World Wars.

As the settlement continued to expand, the chapel became too small for its congregation. In 1920, Munich architect Franz Xaver Boemmel founded Kirchenbauverein Gartenstadt-Neubiberg e.V. (The Association for Supporting the Construction of a Church in Gartenstadt-Neubiberg) with the aim of funding a new church in the town. The building was erected by local company Metzger & Spörkl. The church was consecrated by Michael, Cardinal von Faulhaber on November 11, 1928.

In 1968, the church was renovated and extended with a nave aisle. In 2004, electric heating for the church benches was installed and, in 2005, the walls of the church were stripped of their old colour and whitewashed, according to the requirements of the regional authorities for historic preservation.

== Architecture ==
The church is a plain building with a clear structure and whitewashed walls. Its total length is 40 metres (131 ft) (internal: 22 metres or 72 feet) and its width is 13.3 metres (44 ft) (internal: 11.2 metres or 37 feet). A tower with a flat, tiled roof adjoins the nave at the north east. It is 21.5 metres (71 ft) high and houses three steel bells.

The church is registered for preservation on the regional authority's list of heritage buildings, record number D-1-84-146-1.

== Parish ==
The Parish of Rosenkranzkönigin, Neubiberg, belongs to the Roman Catholic Deanery of Munich-Perlach. The Parish boundaries are approximately the same as those of the municipality of Neubiberg, although the village of Unterbiberg, with its filial church of St. Georg, belongs to the parish St. Michael in Munich-Perlach.

== See also ==
- Our Lady of the Rosary
- Roman Catholic Deanery of Munich-Perlach

== Links ==
- Website of the parish Rosenkranzkönigin Neubiberg

== Bibliography ==
- Pfarrei Rosenkranzkönigin Neubiberg: 50 Jahre Pfarrkuratie, 40 Jahre Stadtpfarrei : 1935, 1945, 1985
- Pfarrgemeinde Rosenkranzkönigin [Neubiberg]: Altarweihe 11. Mai 1969
