= Haidhausen (Munich) =

Quarter of Munich

Coordinates: 48°07′56″N 11°35′52″E

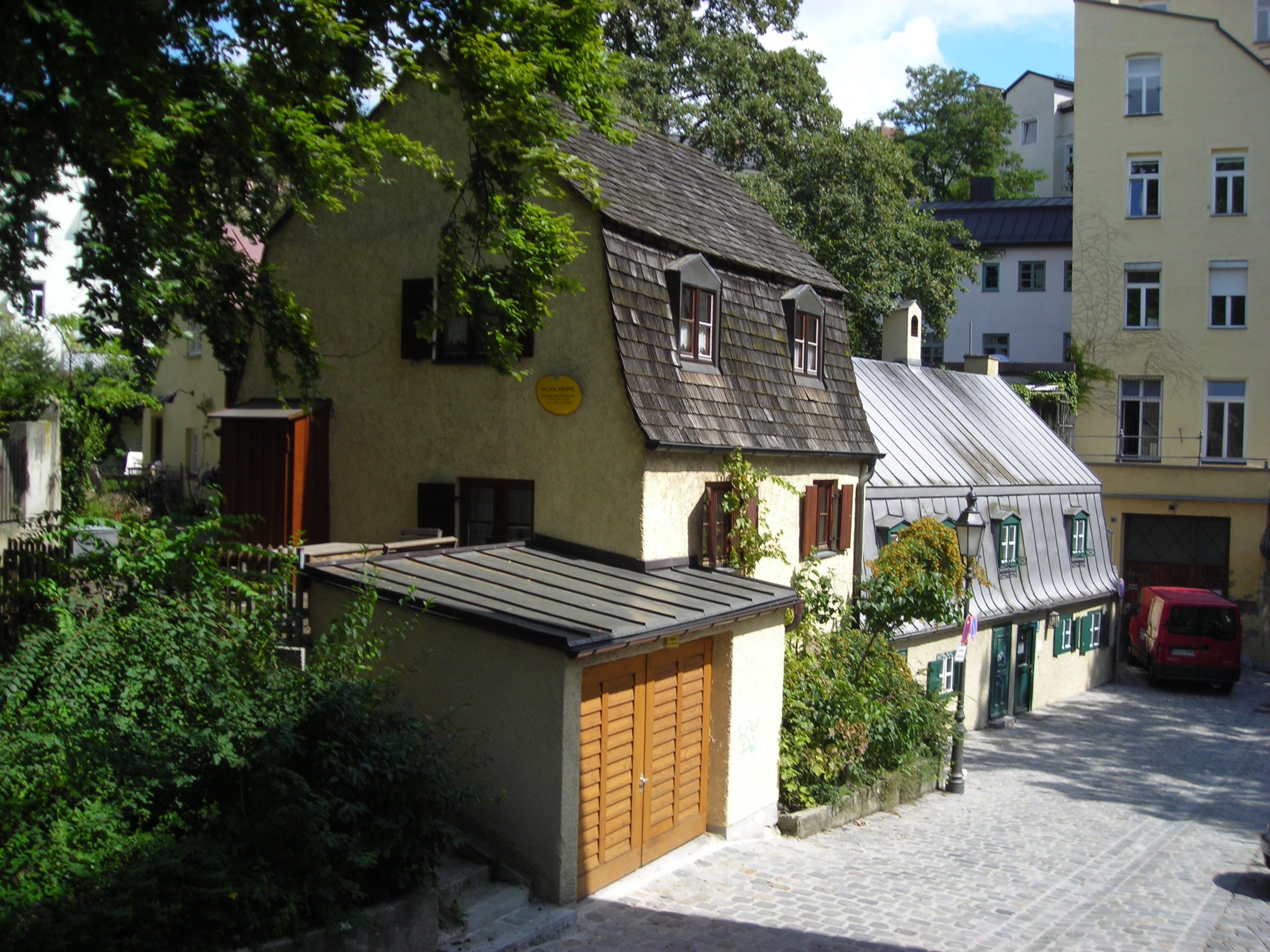
Hostel An der Kreppe (founded in the early 19th century) in the quarter of Haidhausen in Munich. Located between the Max-Weber-Platz and the Wiener Markt

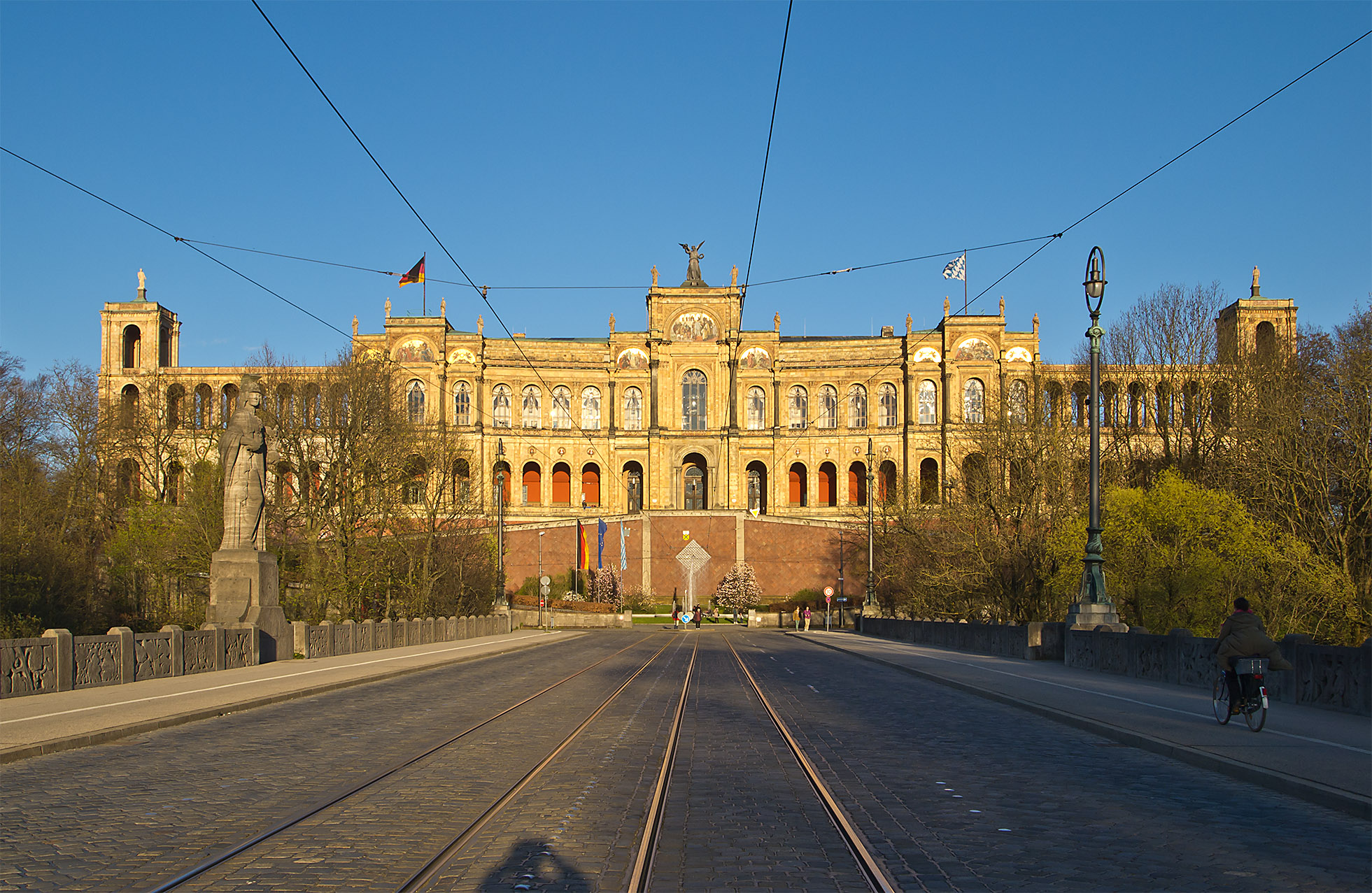
Maximilianeum – Seat of the Bavarian Parliament

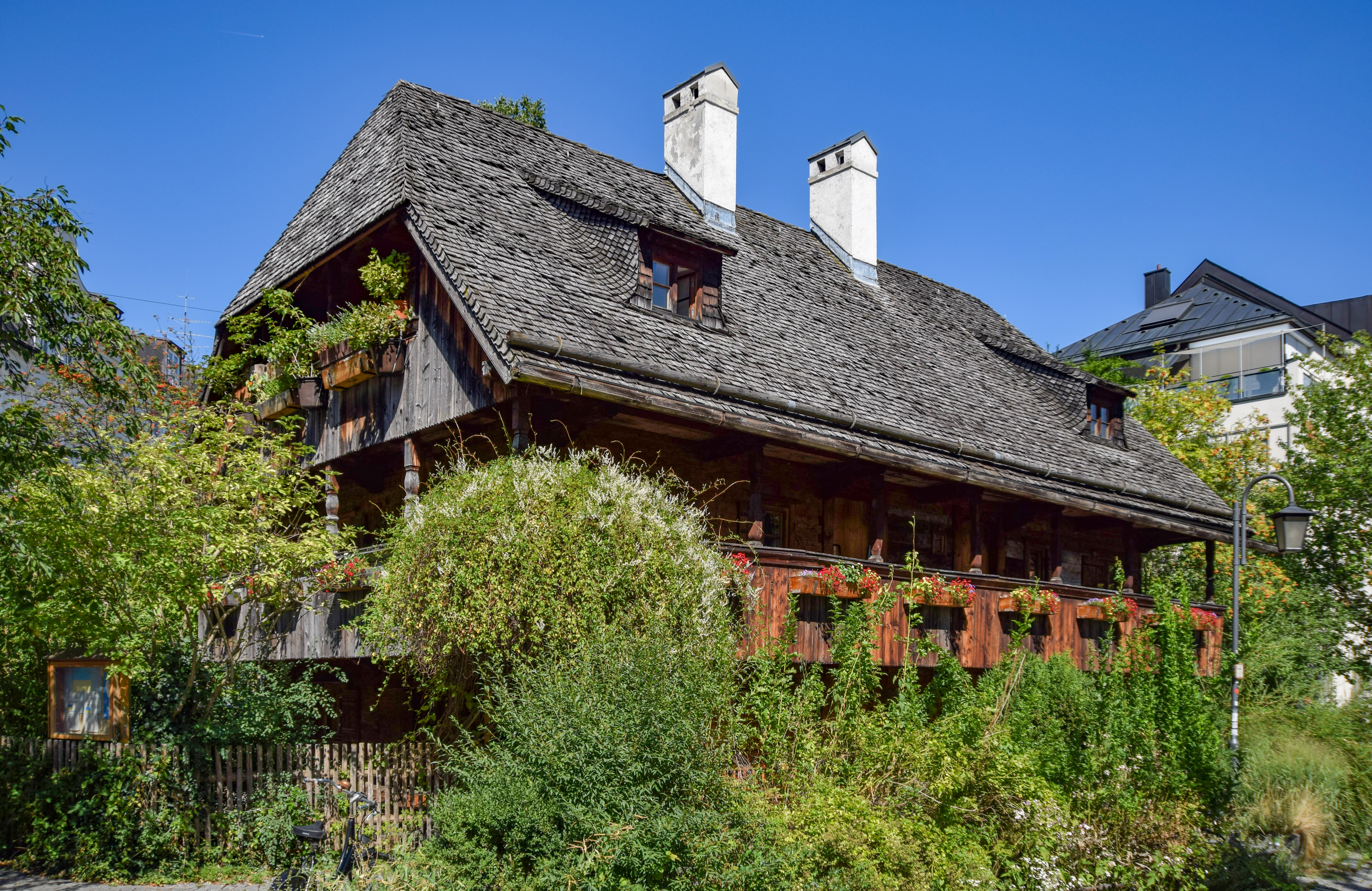
The „Kriechbaumhof“ in the Preysingstraße

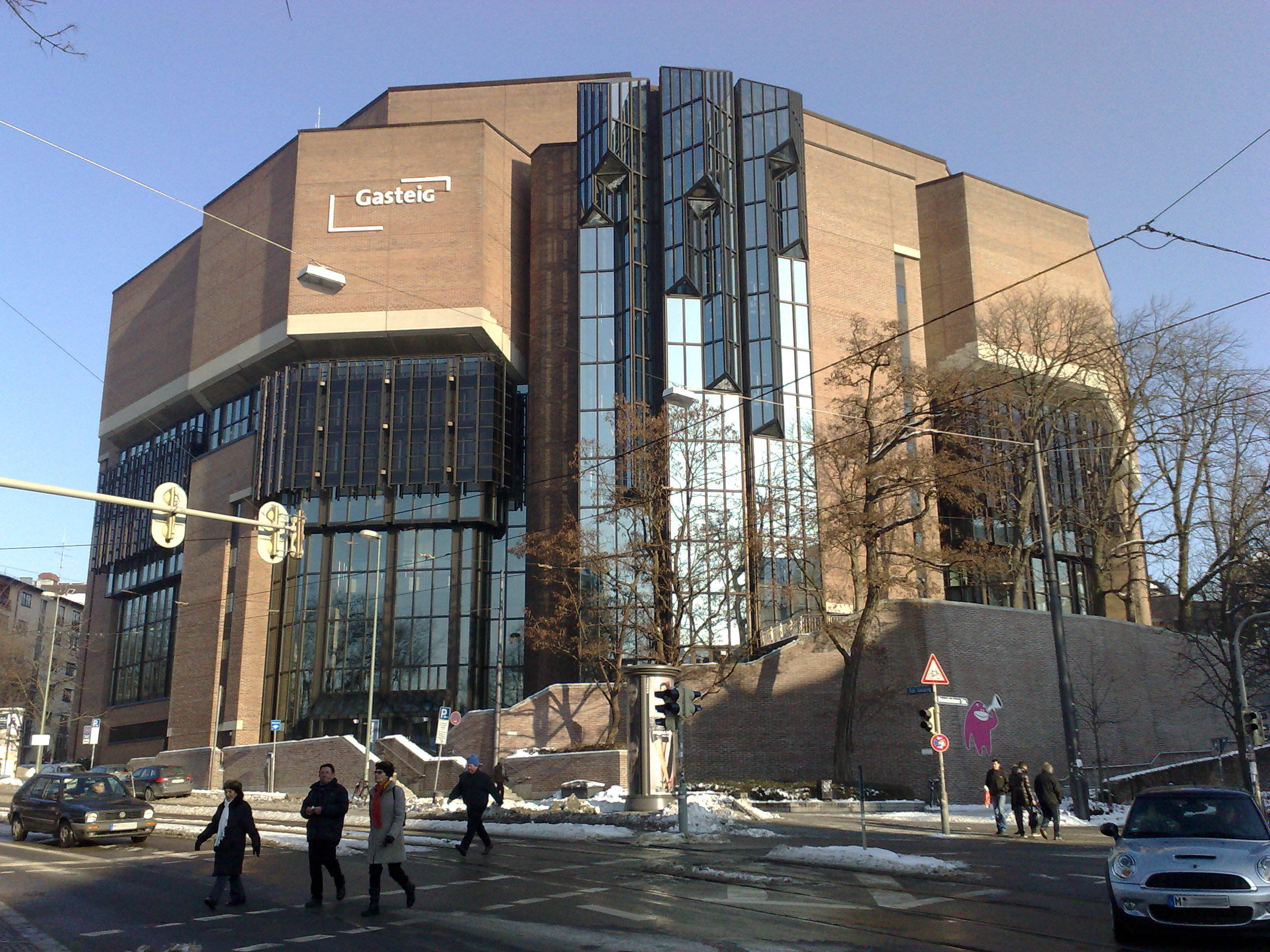
The culture and education center Gasteig

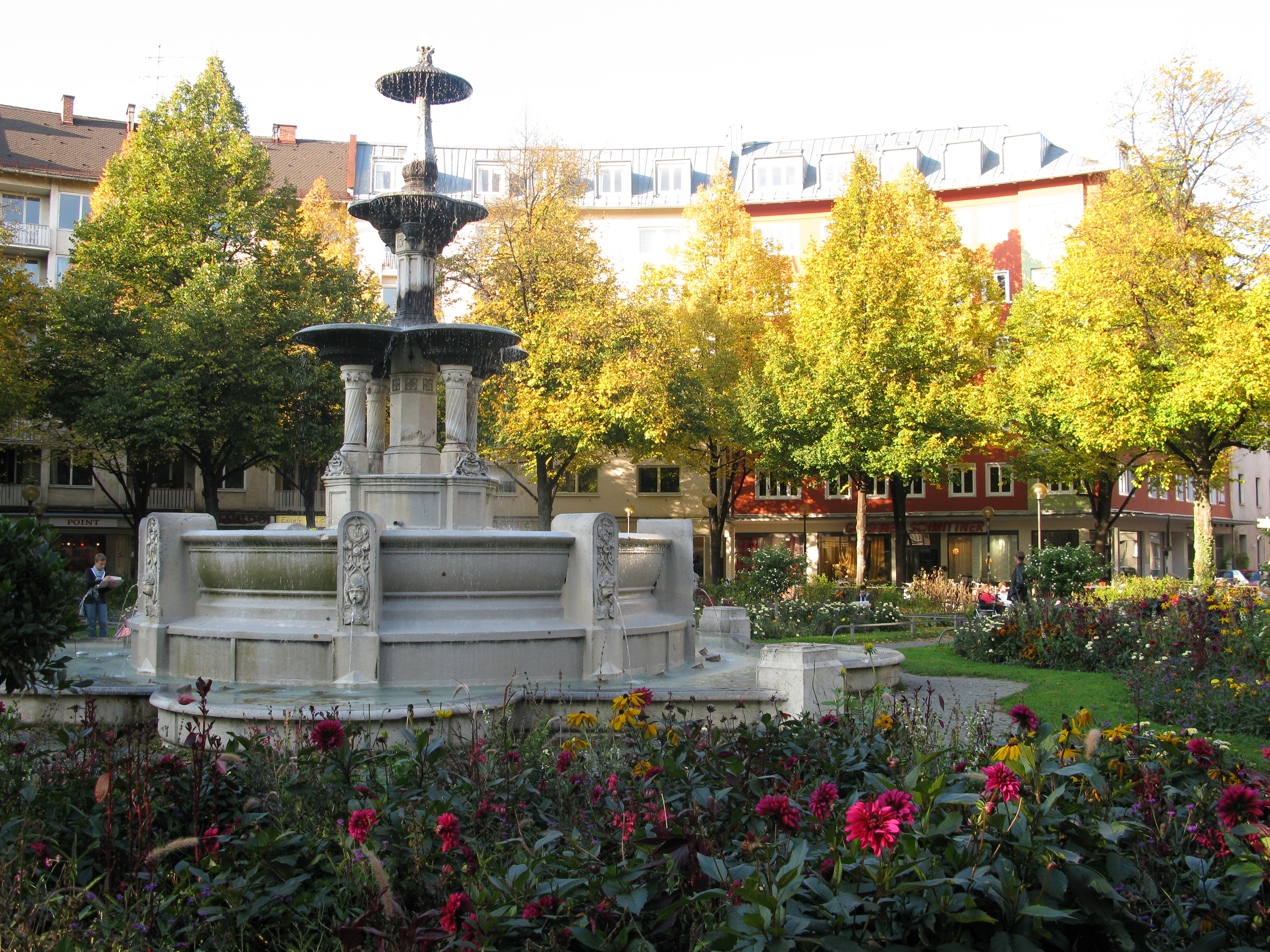
The Weißenburger fountain on Weißenburger Platz between Rosenheimer Platz and Ostbahnhof

Haidhausen (Central Bavarian: Haidhausn) is a quarter in Munich, Germany. It is now part of the borough of Au-Haidhausen.

== Location ==
Haidhausen is bordered to the north by Bogenhausen, Berg am Laim to the east, to the south by Au, and the west border of the district is delimited by the Isar river.

The boundary of the zone runs north along the Prinzregentenstraße avenue then west of the square Vogelweideplatz between the civic amenity site and the tram depot on the railway track which forms the eastern border, where the entire track is still part of Haidhausen. In the south the Rosenheimer, Hoch, Rabl and Balanstraße streets form the border with Au. To the west there are the right banks of the Isar river.

== History ==
Haidhausen was first mentioned in the year 808 under the name of haidhusir described in the documents as a settlement of small houses and a church. From Munich you can reach it via the "gaachen Steig" (very steep path), which in the course of time became the term "Gasteig". The word also stands for the well-known cultural centre that marks the border to Haidhausen today. The salt trail led through Haidhausen to Munich. The production of clay bricks made from loamy soil was economically important at an early stage.

In the High Middle Ages Haidhausen belonged to the domain of the Counts of Wolfratshausen and after their extinction in 1157 to the Counts of Dießen, who renamed themselves von Andechs. Even before the death of the last Count Andechs, Otto III in 1248, the area passed to the Duchy of Bavaria of the Wittelsbach family in 1246 at the latest. From 1610 or 1612 Haidhausen as well as the neighbouring villages Au and Untergiesing belonged to the court ob der Au.

In Haidhausen was the country seat of the Counts of Preysing-Hohenaschau from the 17th century to 1827. Their castle later became church property and in its place the still existing monastery buildings were erected in Preysingstraße. Not far from today's Wiener Platz, small-town structures with hostels for poorer sections of the population had already developed at an early stage, who worked for example in the brick factories. The last of these houses can still be seen today, for example on the Kreppe.

In 1835 there were already 10,000 people living in Haidhausen. Especially at the end of the 19th century, Haidhausen grew strongly as a result of industrialisation. At this time, the hospital Klinikum rechts der Isar was founded here and the Maximilianeum was built as the end point of Maximiliansstraße.

On 1 October 1854, the incorporation of Haidhausen together with Au and Giesing into the city of Munich took place after the inhabitants of the villages had declared their support almost unanimously in May 1848. After two years of construction, the Haidhaus railway station, built by Friedrich Bürklein, architect of the Maximilianeum, was opened in 1871. At that time the area "Auf den Lüften" between the railway station (east), Rosenheimer Straße (south), Milch- and Steinstraße (west), Preysingstraße (north) was still undeveloped. In 1870, Arnold von Zenetti designed a Wilhelminian style urban expansion plan for the "Streets to Braunau Railway Station" for the development of this area.

The semicircular Orleansplatz formed the basis for the symmetrical three-beam system of the Ostbahnhofviertel, which is also known as the "French Quarter" because of its streets named after French towns: Wörthstraße became the central axis – Weißenburger Straße and Belfortstraße the diagonal. In 1872 the first streets were laid out and named after places of victorious battles of the Franco-Prussian War of 1870/71. An exception is Bordeauxplatz, which was later named after the town partnership between Munich and Bordeaux. The area was built between 1870 and 1900 from Rosenheimer Strasse in a northerly direction—mainly in the style of the Neo-Renaissance of the 1880s and the New Baroque of the 1890s.

The development was carried out closely in order to provide affordable housing for the poorer population. Around 1900, one of the most densely populated areas in Munich developed, which today has a particularly high proportion (66%) of older buildings (before 1914).

The 1910 census revealed a population of over 60,000 in the Haidhausen area, and on 5 May 1919, after the Munich Räterepublik had been smashed up, the innkeepers of the Hofbräukeller were shot by members of the Freikorps, who had previously denounced the citizens of Perlach. On 16 October 1919 Adolf Hitler gave his first party political speech to 111 visitors in the Hofbräukeller. On the eve of the Hitler coup on 8 November 1923, Hitler proclaimed the 'National Revolution' in the Bürgerbräukeller on Rosenheimerstrasse.

For a long time, Haidhausen in Munich was regarded as a "shattered glass district" due to its poor conditions. When in the 1980s industrial areas were demolished and replaced by living space, the municipal Gallery Lothringer13 in Lothringerstr. 13, the Muffathalle and the Gasteig Cultural Centre were built, the old buildings were also gradually renovated. The attractiveness of the district gradually increased, so that today Haidhausen is counted among Munich's coveted residential areas, which are characterised by a multitude of shops, cafés, restaurants and a broad cultural offer.

== Church Buildings ==
- Catholic parish church St. Johann Baptist
- Catholic parish church St. Wolfgang
- Lutheran parish church St. Johannes
- Catholic parish church St. Gabriel
- Catholic parish church Alte Haidhauser Kirche

== Nightlife ==
Due to its wide range of bars and restaurants, Haidhausen is considered the third centre of Munich's nightlife after the Glockenbachviertel and Schwabing. Beside inns and beer gardens there are restaurants of almost every state cuisine between Ostbahnhof, Rosenheimer Platz and Max-Weber-Platz.

== Famous locals ==
- Joseph Schülein, 1854–1938, Jewish brewery owner and philanthropist
- Max Reger, 1873–1916, composer
