= Neubiberg =

- Municipality
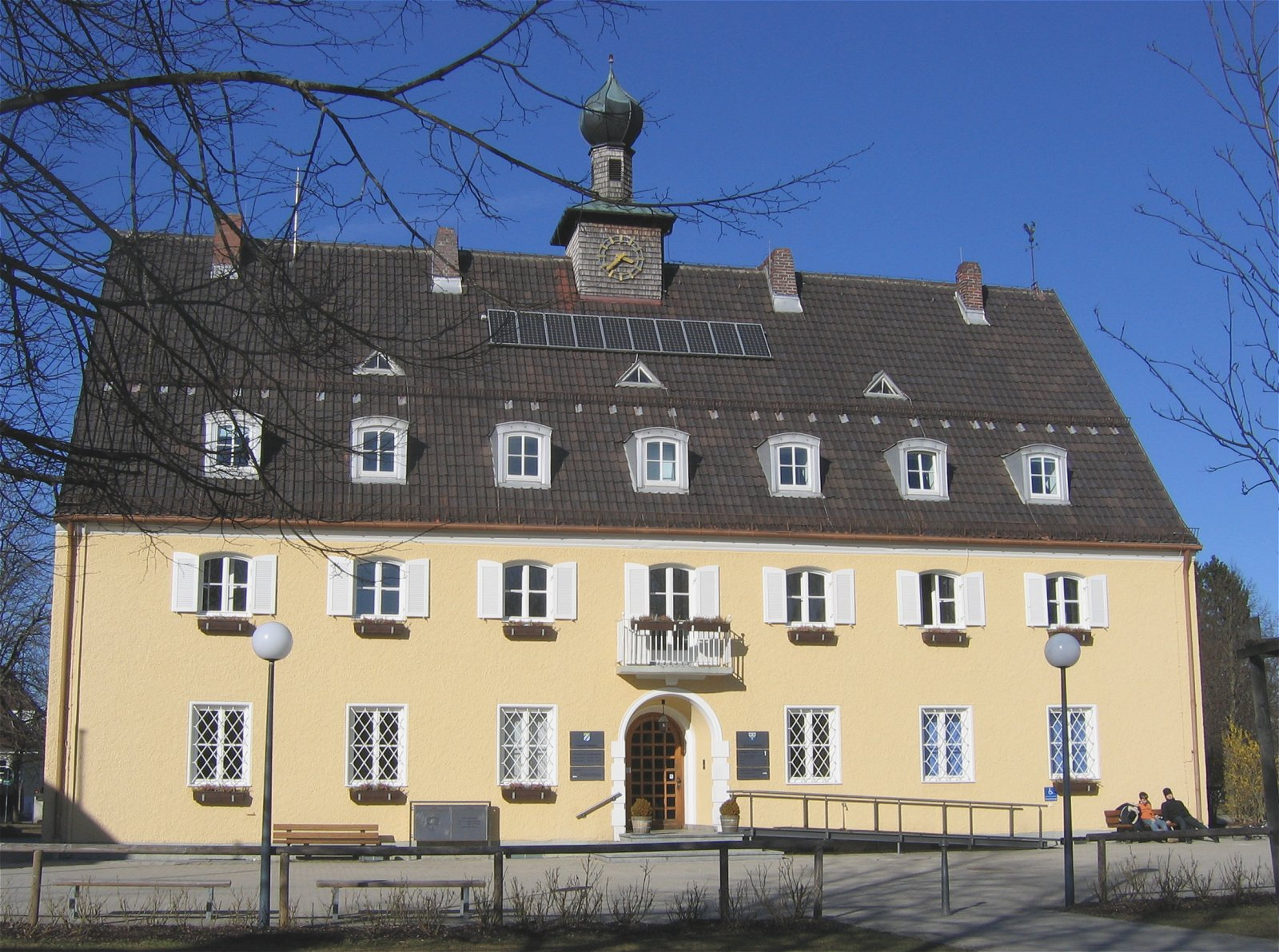
- Town hall

- Coat of arms

- Location of Neubiberg within Munich district
- Interactive map of Neubiberg
- Location within Germany Location within Bavaria
- Coordinates: 48°5′N 11°41′E
- Country: Germany
- State: Bavaria
- Admin. region: Oberbayern
- District: Munich

Government
  - Mayor (2020–26): Thomas Pardeller (CSU)

Area
  - Total: 5.77 km^{2} (2.23 sq mi)
- Elevation: 547–555 m (1,795–1,821 ft)

Population (2025-12-31)
  - Total: 14,351
  - Density: 2,490/km^{2} (6,440/sq mi)
- Time zone: UTC+01:00 (CET)
  - Summer (DST): UTC+02:00 (CEST)
- Postal codes: 85579
- Dialling codes: 089
- Vehicle registration: M
- Website: www.neubiberg.de

Neubiberg (German pronunciation: [nɔʏˈbiːbɛʁk]) is a municipality south-east of Munich, Germany, founded in 1912. It is part of the Munich district of Upper Bavaria.

It used to have a military airport that was used as a Luftwaffe base in the Third Reich. After the war, it served as a U.S. airbase and in the following years as the German Air Force officer school, before this moved to Fürstenfeldbruck. Today, the former airfield is a conservation and leisure area; the remainder of the area is used by the University of the Bundeswehr Munich, one of the two universities of the German military, which are also the only two federal universities in Germany.

Neubiberg proper consists mainly of semi-detached and detached houses and has many gardens. The village of Unterbiberg is part of the municipality and lies to the west of the university, while Neubiberg proper lies to the east. It hosts the headquarters of Infineon Technologies (Campeon) located in the far west of Neubiberg, as well as the headquarters of Intel Deutschland GmbH, a wireless semiconductor business.

Neubiberg is served by the Munich S-Bahn with a stop Neubiberg on line S7. The Campeon is served by the stop Fasanenpark on line S3, on the border to neighboring Unterhaching. Autobahn A8 also runs by Unterbiberg with an exit near the residential area and a tunnel underneath the former airstrip.

== Churches and parishes ==
- Maria Rosenkranzkönigin (Neubiberg) (Roman Catholic Church)
- Corneliuskirche (Evangelical-Lutheran Church)

== Twin towns ==
- Ablon-sur-Seine in France
- Chernogolovka in Russia
