= Baierbrunn =

- Municipality
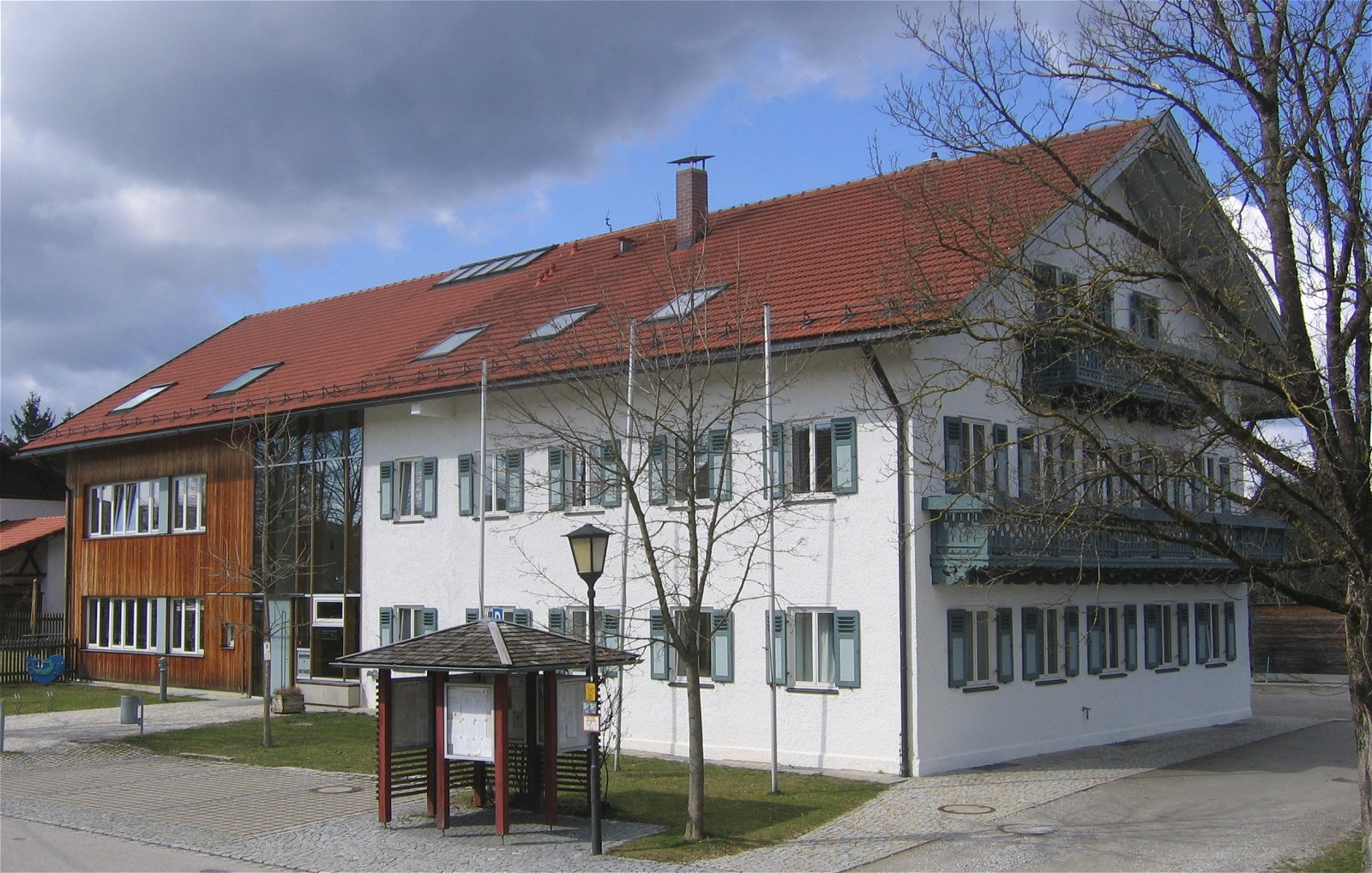
- Town hall

- Coat of arms

- Location of Baierbrunn within Munich district
- Interactive map of Baierbrunn
- Location within Germany Location within Bavaria
- Coordinates: 48°1′N 11°29′E
- Country: Germany
- State: Bavaria
- Admin. region: Oberbayern
- District: Munich

Government
  - Mayor (2020–26): Patrick Ott

Area
  - Total: 7.21 km^{2} (2.78 sq mi)
- Elevation: 626 m (2,054 ft)

Population (2025-12-31)
  - Total: 3,338
  - Density: 463/km^{2} (1,200/sq mi)
- Time zone: UTC+01:00 (CET)
  - Summer (DST): UTC+02:00 (CEST)
- Postal codes: 82065
- Dialling codes: 089
- Vehicle registration: M
- Website: www.baierbrunn.de

Baierbrunn (pronounced [ˈbaɪɐbʁʊn]) is a municipality in the district of Munich in the south-German state Bavaria. It is located between Schäftlarn and Pullach on the Bundesstraße 11 and consists of the two villages Baierbrunn and Buchenhain. Baierbrunn has a stop on the S7 of the Munich S-Bahn.

== History ==
Some remains of a hillfort from the Early Middle Ages, called Birg, can be found on the area of the municipality of Baierbrunn. The earliest known mentioning of Baierbrunn was in 776 on a deed of gift from Kloster Schäftlarn. It became an independent municipality in 1818. The village of Buchenhain started 1900 with an inn called "Waldgasthof". There used to be a ski slope until late in the 1930s, which remains are still visible today in the south of Baierbrunn. The municipality was part of the men's individual road race at the summer Olympics of Munich in 1972

== Transport ==
The municipality has two stations on the Isar Valley Railway: Baierbrunn and Buchenhain. Both are served by the Munich S-Bahn. Line is S7. The rails are single trail since previous station Höllriegelskreuth and trains cross at Baierbrunn station.

== Sources ==
- Alfred Hutterer: Am Brunnen der Baiern. Baierbrunn 1985
- Joachim Lauchs: Baierbrunn. Eine Chronik, Verlag Wort & Bild Becker, Baierbrunn 1988, ISBN 3-927216-00-3
