= Icking station =

Railway station in Bavaria

Icking
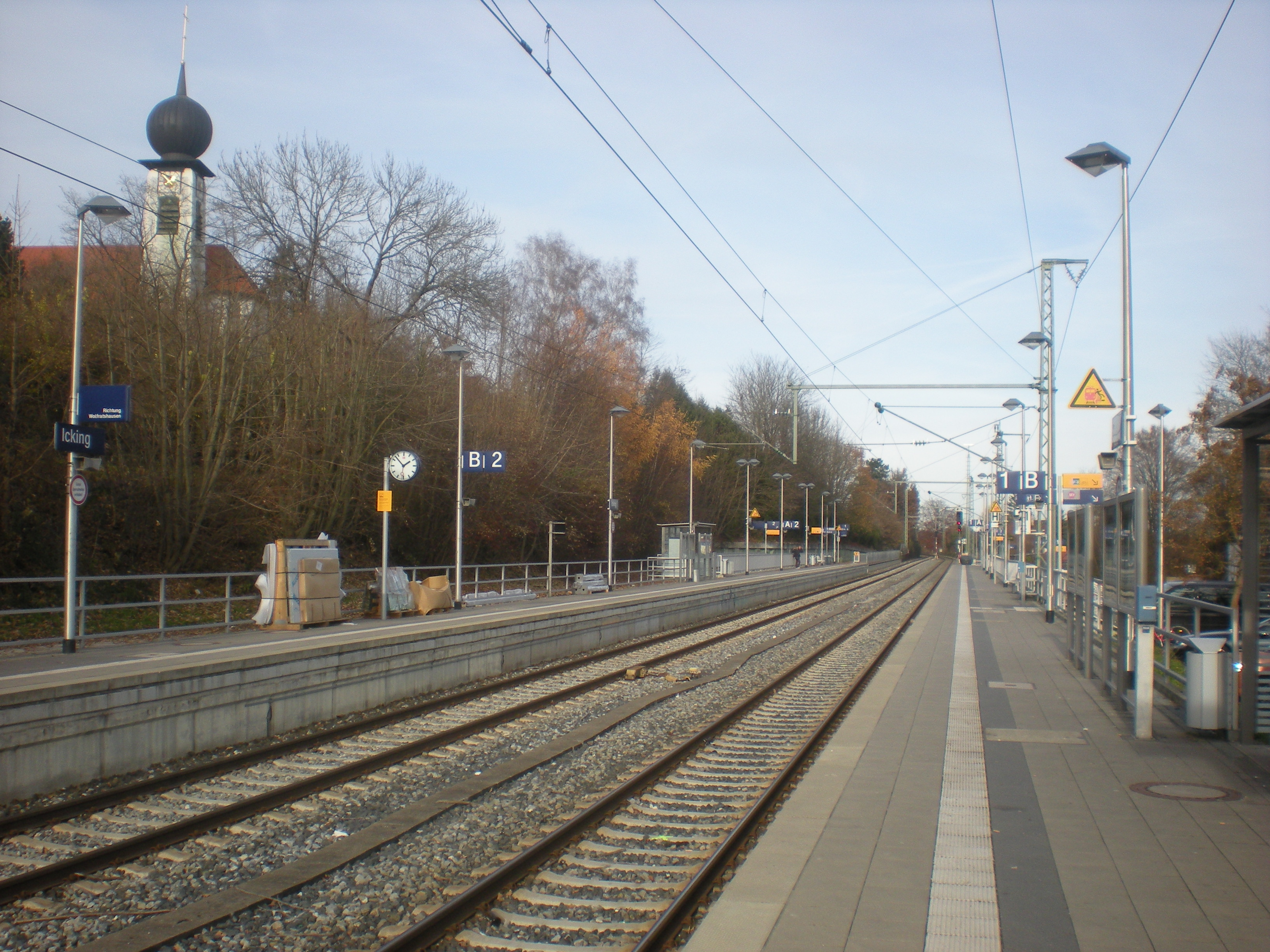
- The station in 2012

General information
- Location: Icking, Bavaria; Germany
- Coordinates: 47°57′12″N 11°26′12″E
- Owner: DB Netz
- Operator: DB Station&Service
- Lines: Isar Valley line (KBS 999.7)
- Distance: 21.4 km (13.3 mi) from Munich Isartalbf
- Platforms: 2 side platforms
- Tracks: 2
- Train operators: S-Bahn München
- Connections: 974

Other information
- Station code: 2963
- DS100 code: MIC
- IBNR: 8003039
- Category: 6
- Fare zone: 2 and 3 (MVV)

Services
Preceding station	Munich S-Bahn	Following station
Wolfratshausen Terminus	S7	Ebenhausen-Schäftlarn towards München Hbf
Location

Icking station (German: Bahnhof Icking) is a railway station in the municipality of Icking, in Bavaria, Germany. It is located on the Isar Valley line of Deutsche Bahn.

== Services ==
As of the December 2021 timetable change, the following services stop at Icking:

- S7: two trains per hour between Wolfratshausen and Höhenkirchen-Siegertsbrunn; some trains continue from Höhenkirchen-Siegertsbrunn to Kreuzstraße.
