= Buchenhain station =

Railway station in Bavaria

Buchenhain
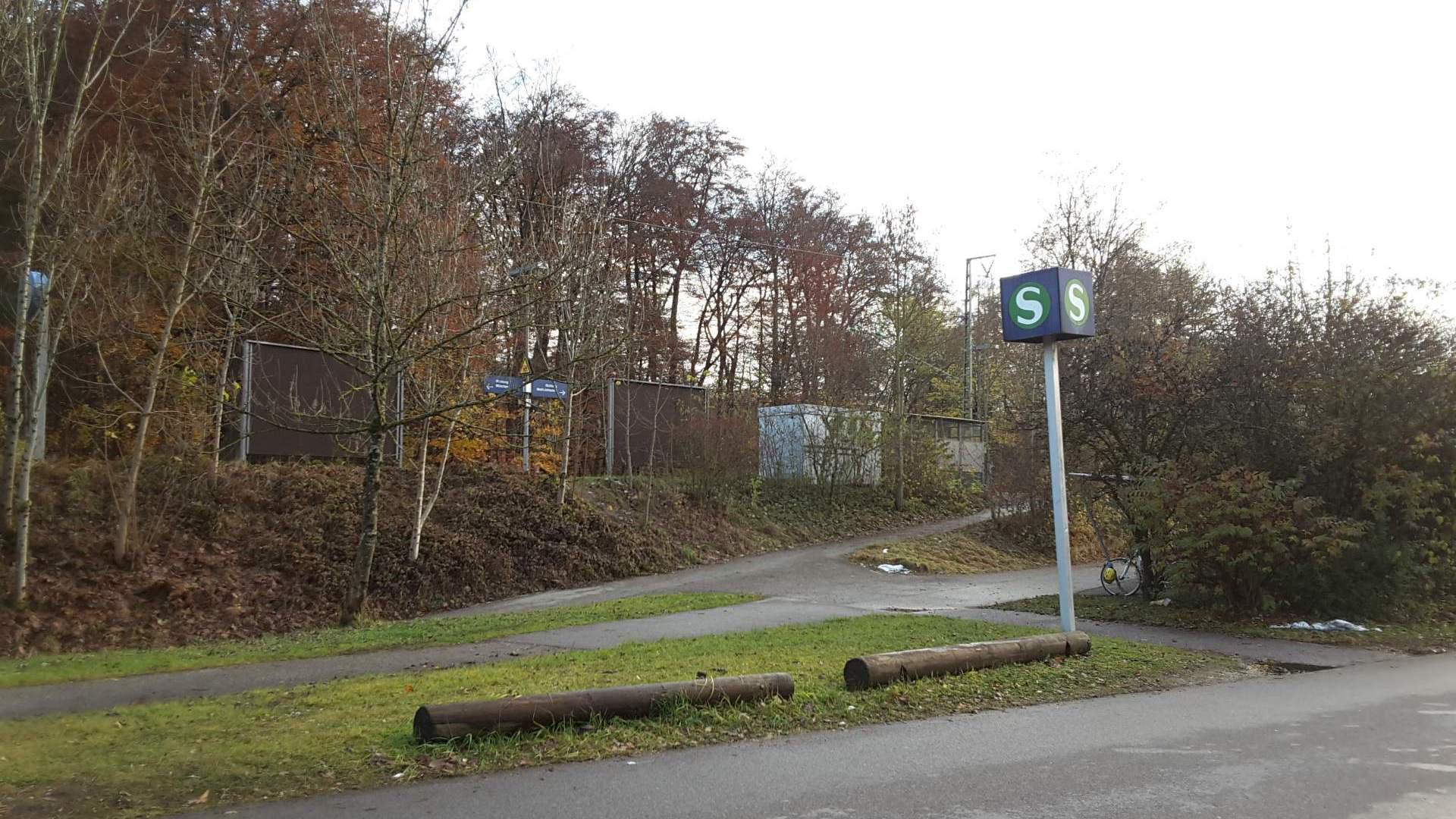
- The station in 2016

General information
- Location: Baierbrunn, Bavaria; Germany
- Coordinates: 48°01′53″N 11°29′51″E
- Owner: DB Netz
- Operator: DB Station&Service
- Lines: Isar Valley line (KBS 999.7)
- Distance: 11.1 km (6.9 mi) from Munich Isartalbf
- Platforms: 1 side platform
- Tracks: 1
- Train operators: S-Bahn München

Other information
- Station code: 935
- DS100 code: MBHA
- IBNR: 8001231
- Category: 6
- Fare zone: 1 (MVV)

Services
Preceding station	Munich S-Bahn	Following station
Baierbrunn towards Wolfratshausen	S7	Höllriegelskreuth towards München Hbf
Location

Buchenhain station (German: Bahnhof Buchenhain) is a railway station in the municipality of Baierbrunn, in Bavaria, Germany. It is located on the Isar Valley line of Deutsche Bahn.

== Services ==
As of the December 2021 timetable change, the following services stop at Buchenhain:

- S7: two trains per hour between Wolfratshausen and Höhenkirchen-Siegertsbrunn; some trains continue from Höhenkirchen-Siegertsbrunn to Kreuzstraße.
