= Baierbrunn station =

Railway station in Bavaria

Baierbrunn
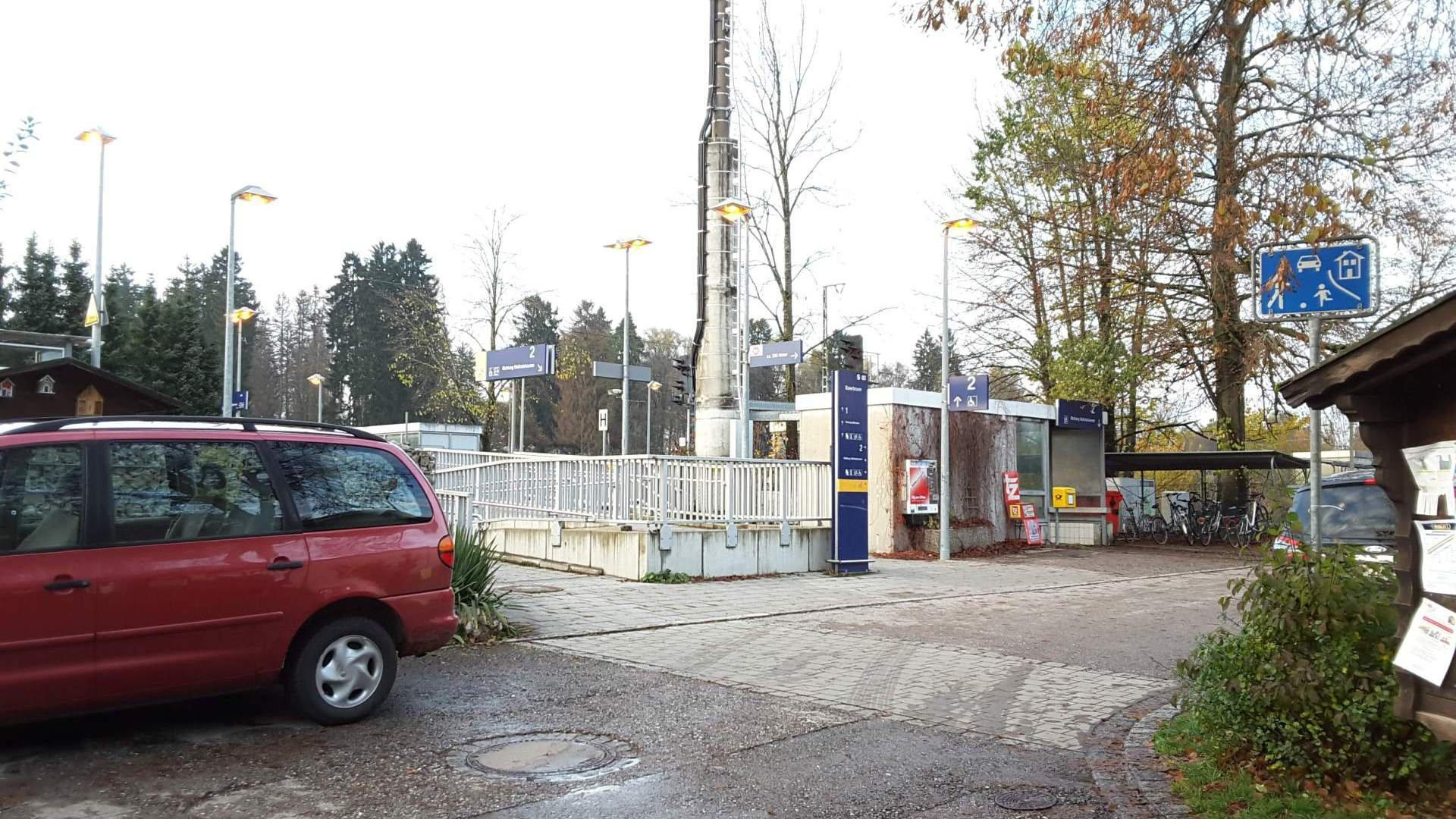
- The station in 2016

General information
- Location: Baierbrunn, Bavaria; Germany
- Coordinates: 48°01′07″N 11°28′48″E
- Owner: DB Netz
- Operator: DB Station&Service
- Lines: Isar Valley line (KBS 999.7)
- Distance: 12.9 km (8.0 mi) from Munich Isartalbf
- Platforms: 2 side platforms
- Tracks: 2
- Train operators: S-Bahn München

Other information
- Station code: 377
- DS100 code: MBAB
- IBNR: 8000781
- Category: 6
- Fare zone: 1 (MVV)

Services
Preceding station	Munich S-Bahn	Following station
Hohenschäftlarn towards Wolfratshausen	S7	Buchenhain towards München Hbf
Location

Baierbrunn station (German: Bahnhof Baierbrunn) is a railway station in the municipality of Baierbrunn, in Bavaria, Germany. It is located on the Isar Valley line of Deutsche Bahn.

== Services ==
As of the December 2021 timetable change, the following services stop at Baierbrunn:

- S7: two trains per hour between Wolfratshausen and Höhenkirchen-Siegertsbrunn; some trains continue from Höhenkirchen-Siegertsbrunn to Kreuzstraße.
