= Josef Peruschitz =

German Roman Catholic Benedictine priest

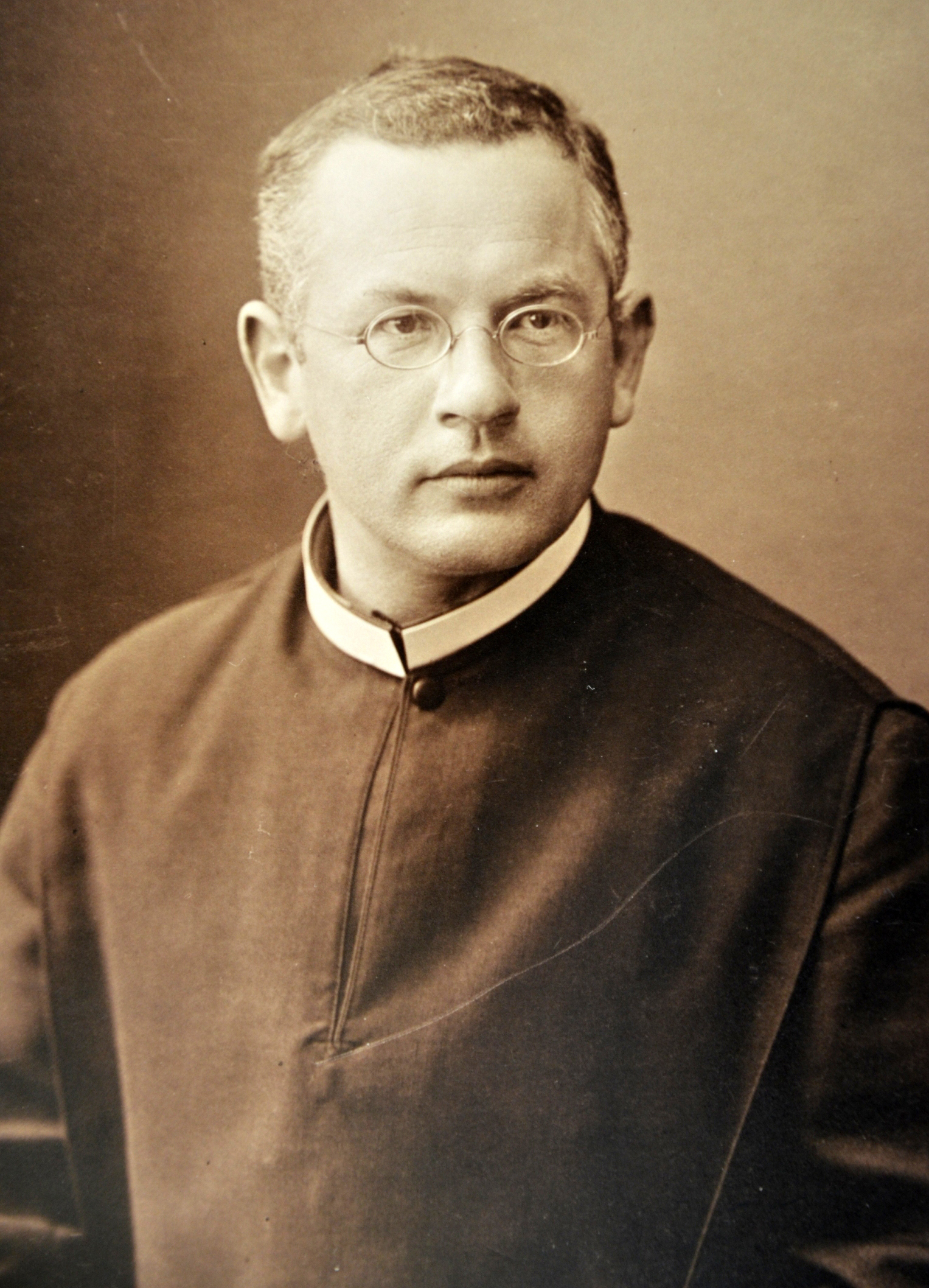
- Church: Catholic Church
- Archdiocese: Munich and Freising

Orders
- Ordination: 28 April 1895 by Antonius von Thoma

Personal details
- Born: Benedikt Peruschitz; 21 March 1871 Straßlach-Dingharting, district court Wolfratshausen, Bavaria, German Empire
- Died: 15 April 1912 (aged 41) Atlantic Ocean
- Denomination: Roman Catholic
- Occupation: principal

Josef Peruschitz (21 March 1871 - 15 April 1912) was a German Roman Catholic Benedictine priest who was killed during the sinking of the RMS Titanic on 15 April 1912.

== Early life ==
Josef (originally named Benedikt Peruschitz) was born to Mathias Peruschitz and Elisabeth Peruschitz, née Neudecker in Straßlach-Dingharting, district court Wolfratshausen in Bavaria. Josef and his family moved to Dorfen, administration district Erding. From 1882 until 1886 he was a student at Scheyern, and from 1886 until 1890 at the Royal High School in Freising, from which he graduated in August 1890.

=== Priesthood ===
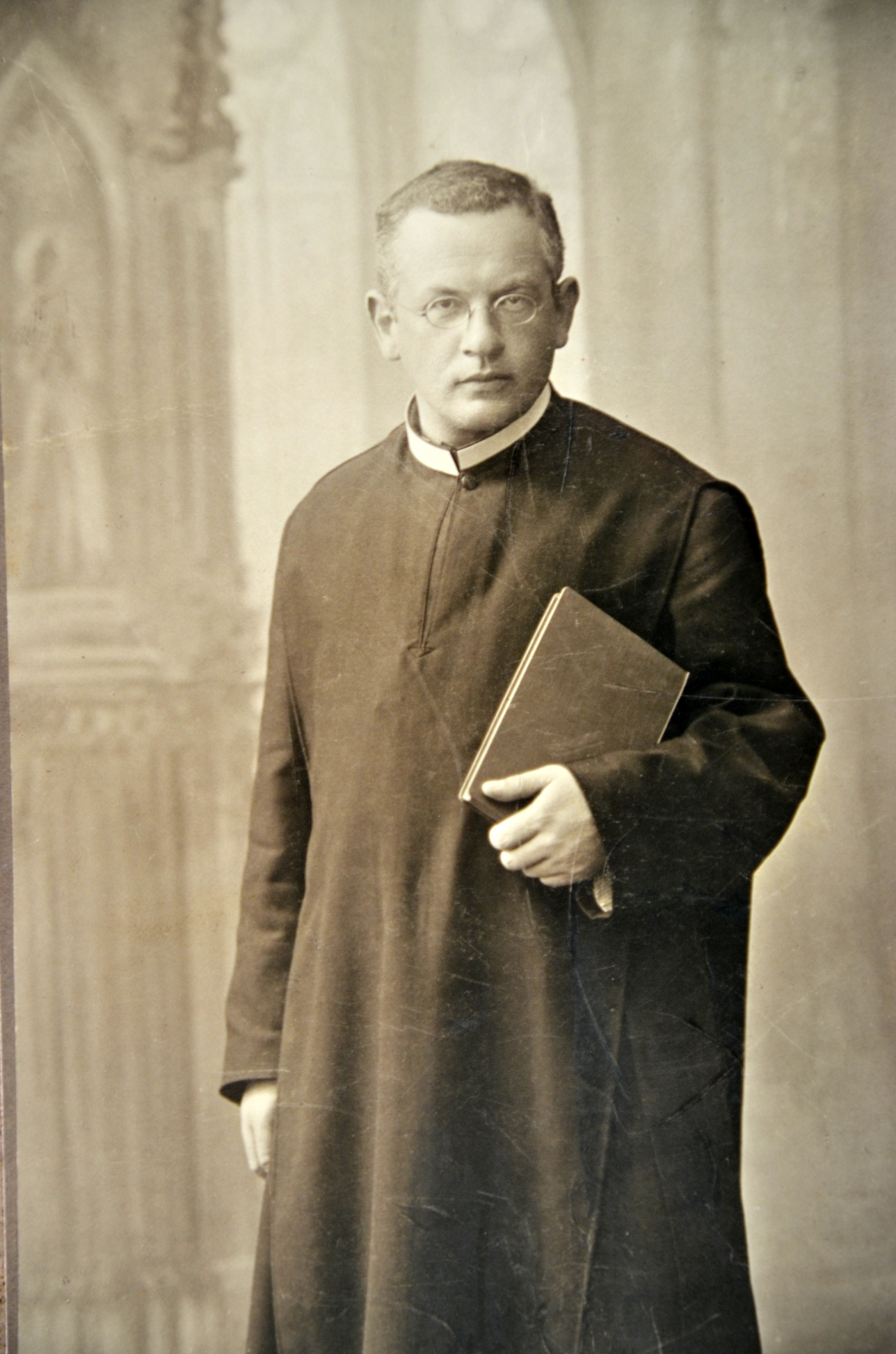
Fr. Peruschitz at the Scheyern monastery

Josef began to study philosophy at the Royal High School from 1890 to 1891. In July 1891, he was admitted to study theology and by 1894, when he submitted his resume to the Scheyern monastery, was in his sixth semester. On 16 April 1894 he requested admission to a monastery, and it was granted on 26 April; he officially entered on 14 August 1894 as Father Joseph. On 28 April 1895 he was ordained by the Archbishop of Munich-Freising, Antonious von Thoma, at the parish church of Scheyern and was professed as a monk on 24 August 1895; In the monastery he had several teaching and educational jobs, including mathematics, music, physical education, shorthand and prefect. In 1912, Josef spent Holy Week at the Benedictine cloister St. Augustine in Ramsgate, after which he was en route to St. Cloud, Minnesota where he was to be employed at the Swiss Congregation's Benedictine School. He was apparently to be principal of their high school.

== Titanic ==
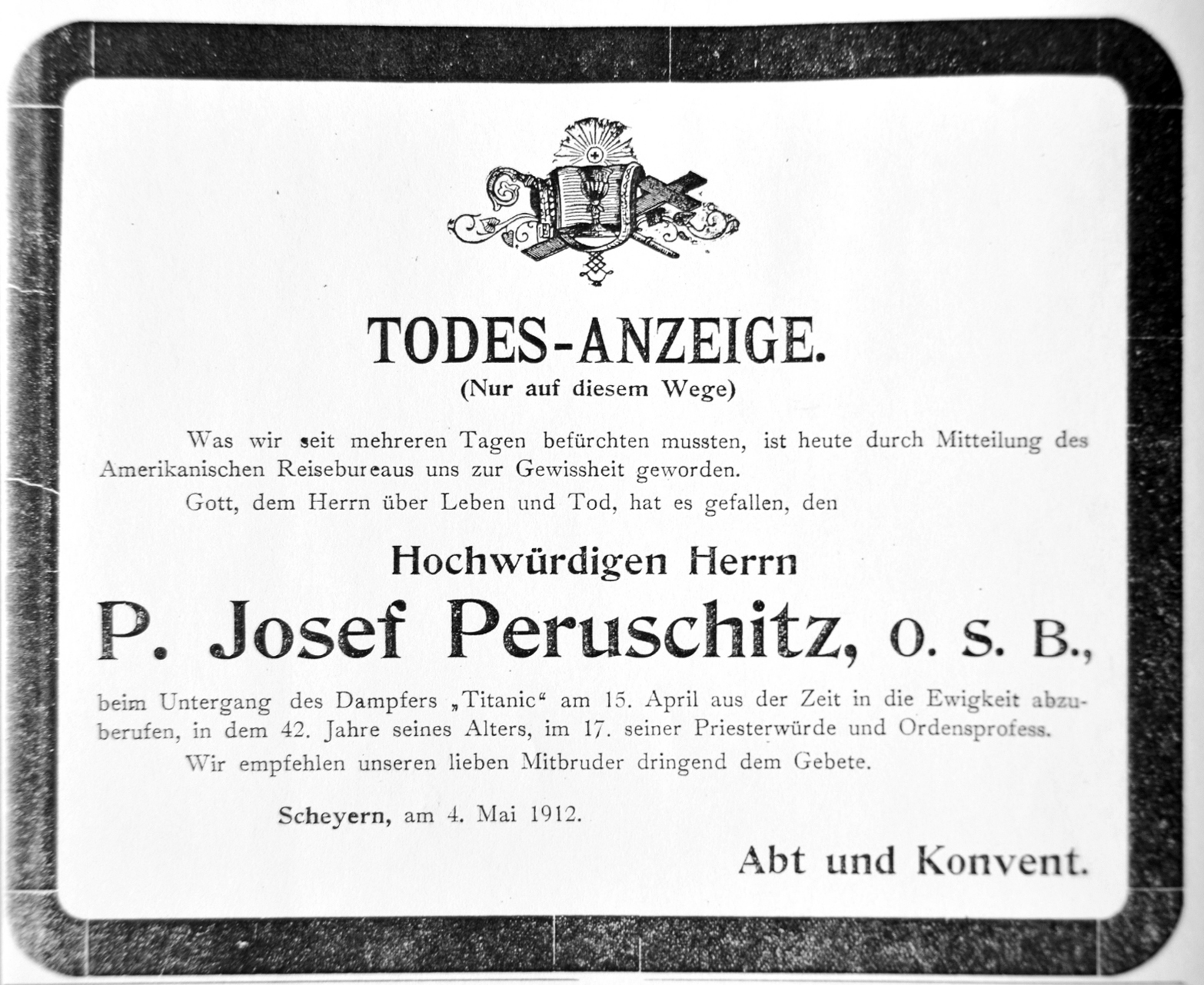
Fr. Peruschitz's German obituary

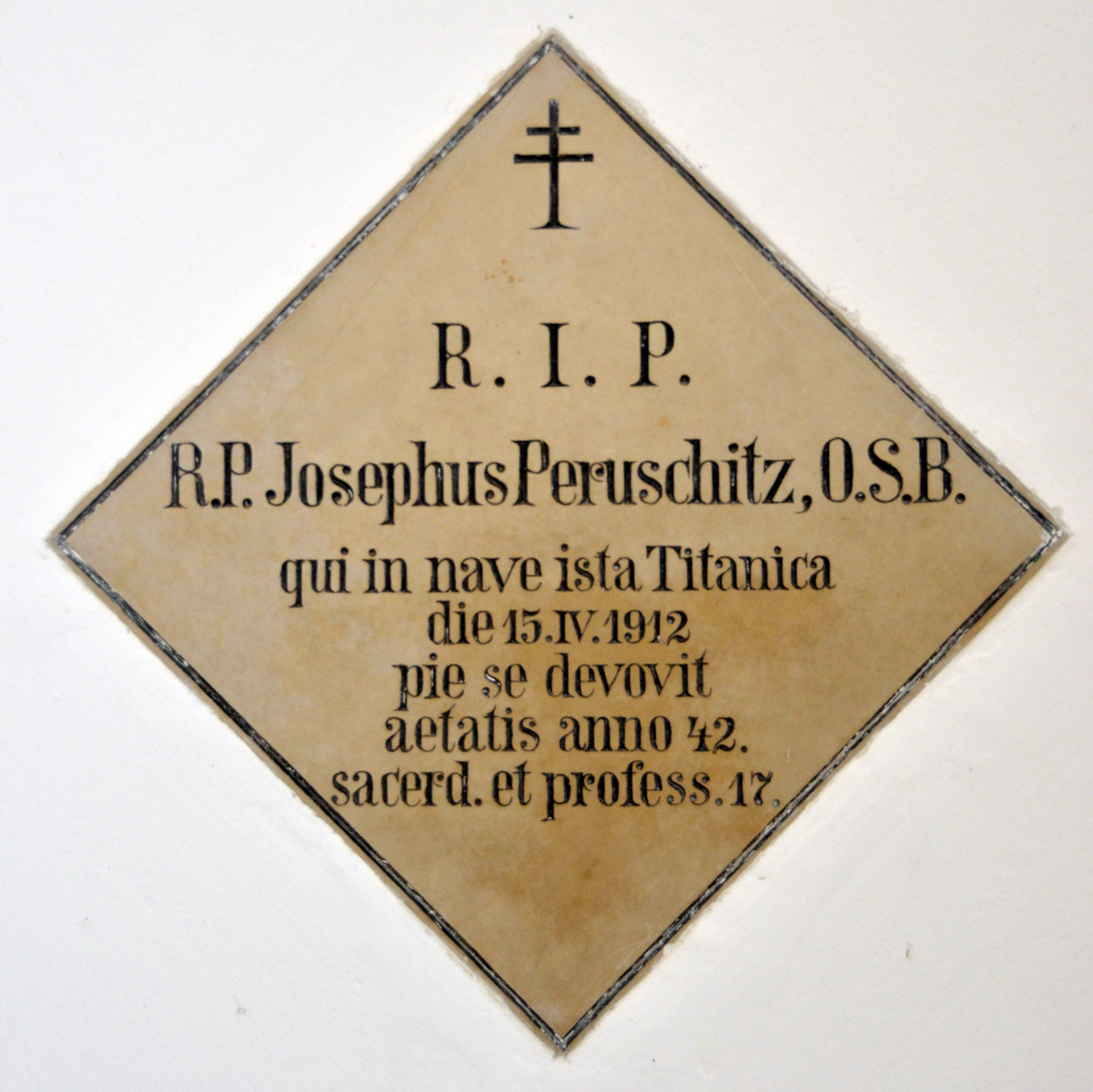
A memorial plaque place outside the Scheyern monastery

Josef traveled to Southampton and boarded the RMS Titanic on 10 April; a survivor named Lawrence Beesley said that Josef and two other priests, Fr. Montvila and Fr. Thomas Byles held daily mass aboard the ship and during the sinking, "When all the excitement became fearful all the Catholics on board desired the assistance of priests with the greatest fervour. Both priests aroused those condemned to die to say acts of contrition and prepare themselves to meet the face of God. They led the rosary and others answered. The sound of the recitation irritated a few passengers, and some ridiculed those who prayed and started a ring dance around them. The two priests were engaged continuously giving general absolution to those who were about to die. Those entering the lifeboats were consoled with moving words. Some women refused to be separated from their husbands, preferring to die with them. Finally, when no more women were near, some men were allowed into the boats. Father Peruschitz was offered a place which he declined." Josef's body was never identified and he is remembered with a plaque in the cloister at the Scheyern Monastery.
