= Truma (company) =

Truma Gerätetechnik GmbH & Co. KG
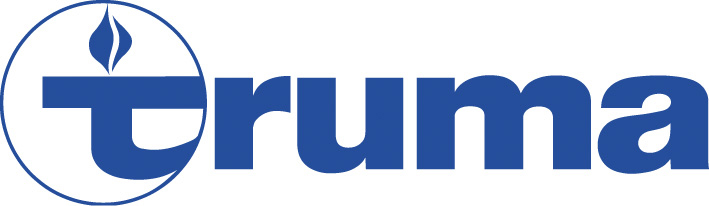
- Trade name: Truma
- Type: GmbH & Co. KG
- Industry: travel trailer & RV
- Founded: Munich, Germany (1949)
- Founder: Philipp Kreis
- Headquarters: Putzbrunn, Germany
- Key people: Alexander Wottrich, Robert Strauß
- Products: heaters, boilers, air cons, gas products, manoeuvring systems, iNet system
- Website: www.truma.com

Truma Gerätetechnik GmbH & Co. KG is a German manufacturer of leisure products for caravans and motorhomes. The company develops, manufactures and sells heating and air conditioning systems, hot water boilers, maneuvering systems and products for energy and gas supply. Truma was founded in 1949 in Munich, Germany. Today the headquarters is located in Putzbrunn near Munich and the company operates worldwide sales offices. Since the introduction of the first Truma heater in 1961 the company remained the market leader for LPG air heaters for recreational vehicles in Europe.

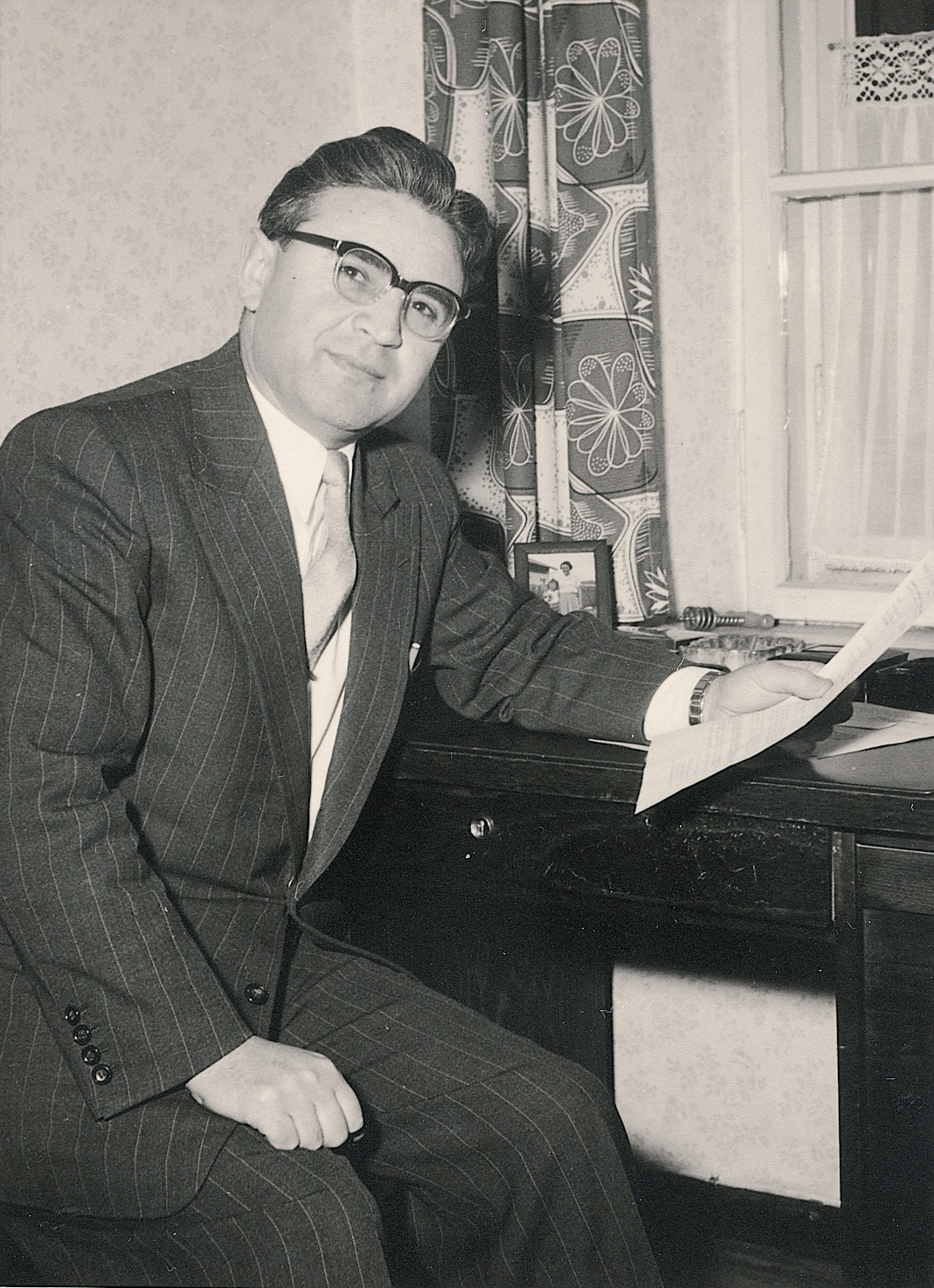
Truma founder Philipp Kreis

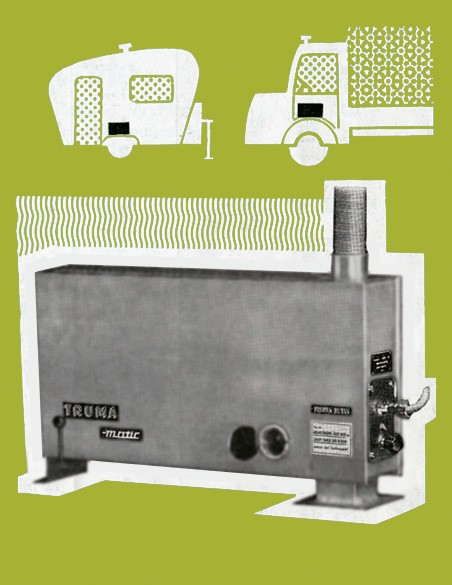
The first Truma caravan heater

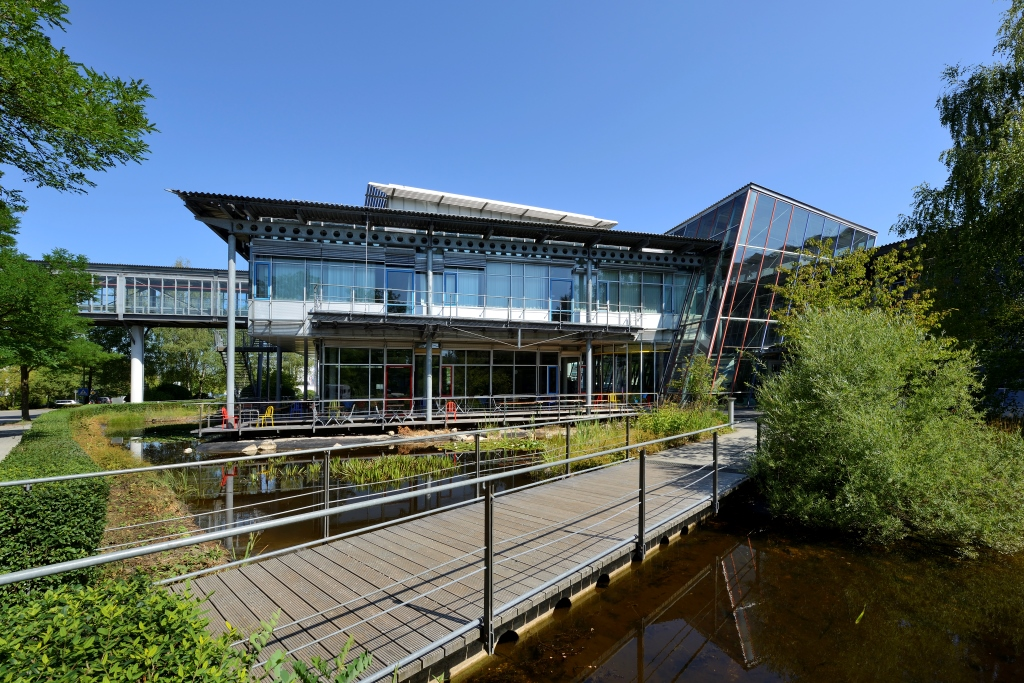
Modern Truma company building in Putzbrunn near Munich.

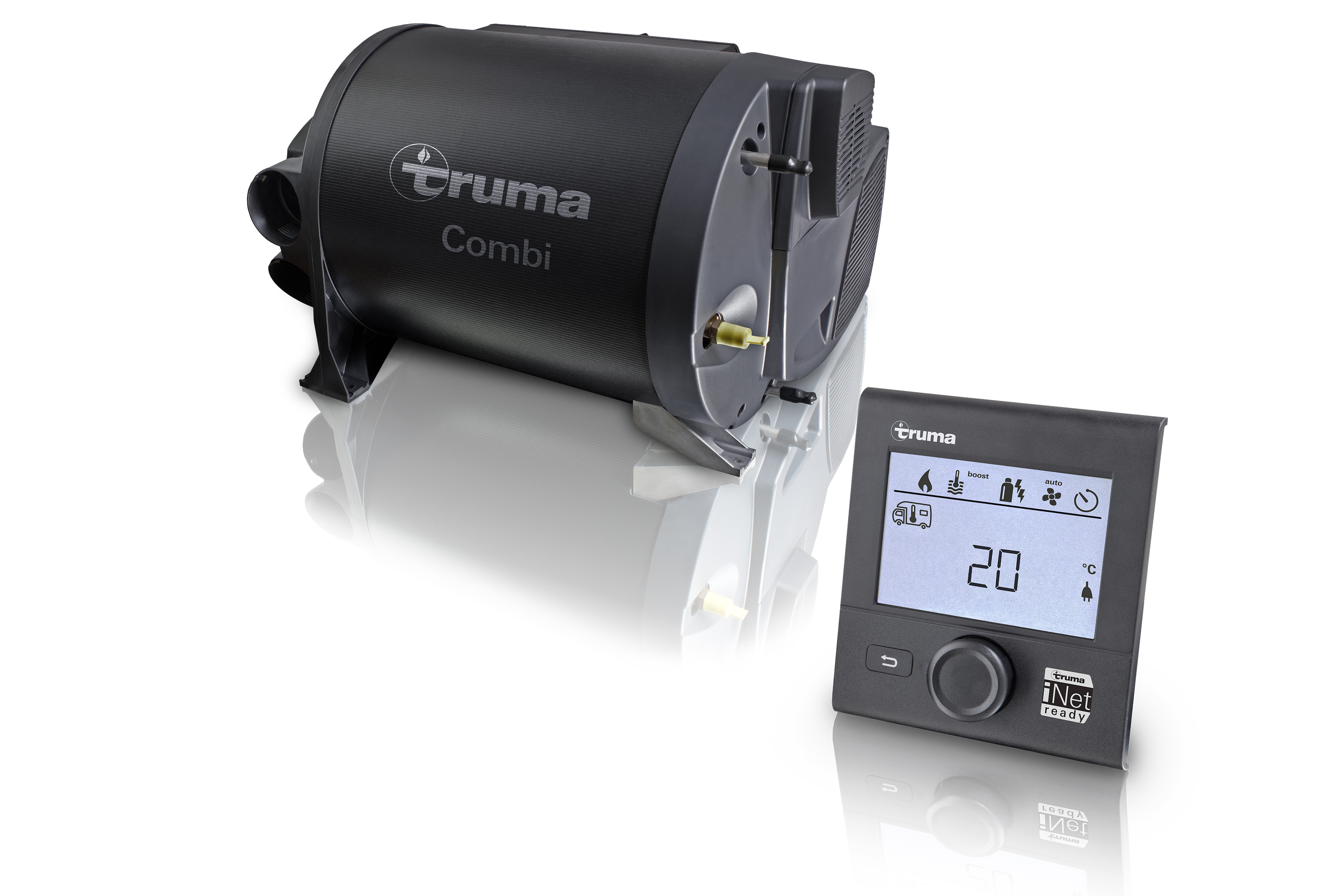
Truma Combi heater and digital control panel CP plus iNet ready.

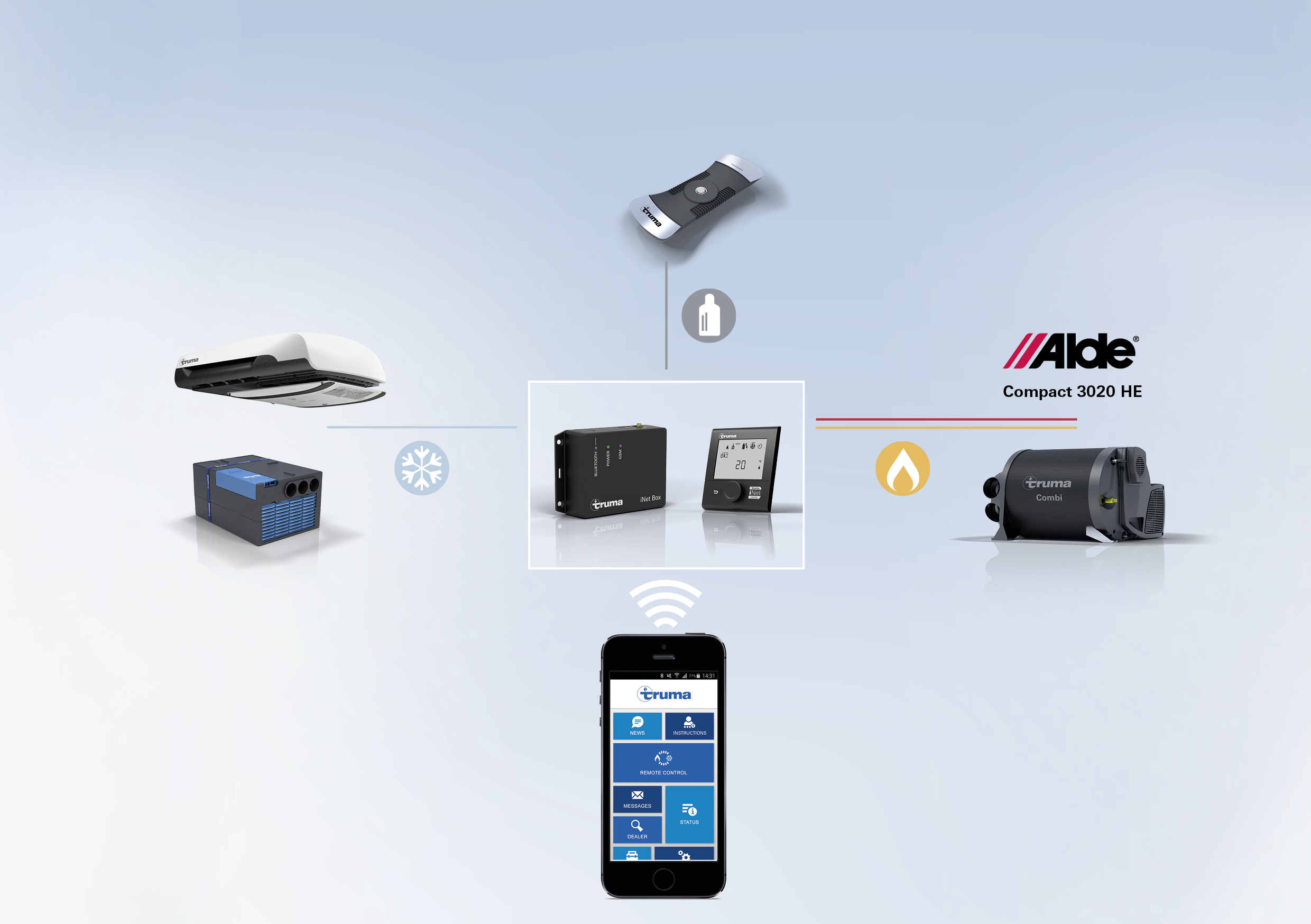
The Truma iNet Box is the smart interface that allows you to control your Truma appliances with the App.

== History ==
=== 1949 ===
Truma was founded in 1949 by Philipp Kreis who after returning from World War II initially ran a language school for English in Munich. The unreliable power supply in the postwar period with constant power cuts was a major problem for the night school. Philipp Kreis used the functioning gas pipelines and developed gas lamps, which brightly illuminated the school even during power outages. Quickly, the school turned into a company for the production of gas lights. Philip Kreis named his company Truma in reference to the former U.S. President Harry S. Truman, whom he admired for his efforts for the reconstruction of Germany after the war.

=== 1955-1982 ===
In 1955 Truma released the first quick-acting valve to shut off to the gas lines. The gas lamps became popular in camping and caravanning, and Philip Kreis decided to enter this market with other products. In 1961, the Truma-matic hit the market, the first officially recognized caravan heater that worked independently from the power supply on the basis of LPG. In 1969 Truma started with the gas pressure regulator Duomatic. In 1975, the electrical controlled Trumatic E was introduced, which could also be installed in mobile homes, boats, and trucks. 1976 Truma allowed hot water supply in caravans and motorhomes by introducing the Truma Therme. The development of a gas boiler with up to 14 liters five years later made showering in a caravan possible.

=== 1983-2003 ===
In 1983 the company moved into new buildings next to the site of production in Putzbrunn, located just a few kilometers out of Munich. 1988 Philipp Kreis resigned from the operative business and handed over to his daughter Renate Schimmer-Wottrich. Truma developed in 1994 the Trumatic C, which offered heating and hot water from a single device. Many motorhome manufacturers took it immediately into production. In 1997 a Truma subsidiary for sales and service was established in UK. In 1999 Truma released the first maneuvering system for caravans and an air-conditioning systems for caravans and RVs.

=== 2004-2010 ===
In 2004 Truma opened a Service Centre. One year later, the technology and innovation center was built containing two huge climate testing chambers where equipment and vehicles of OEMs or journalists can be tested under practical conditions. In 2007 Truma ItaliaSrl was founded. 2008 a representative office in China was established. In the same year, Renate Schimmer-Wottrich resigned from the Managing Board and became chairman of the newly formed advisory board. 2010 Truma releases AquaStar to the market.

=== 2011-2014 ===
In 2011, the company owner established Truma's Renate Schimmer-Wottrich Foundation to promote projects with a focus on helping children, young adults and families. That same year, Truma entered the segment for roof-mounted air conditioning systems for recreational vehicles with the Aventa comfort. In 2012, Truma celebrated 50 years of caravan heating with two new S heater models and also introduced a fuel cell to the market. The VeGA generates electricity from LPG, which enables an energy supply independent of a network. In 2013, the company closed Truma Electronic Systems (formerly Calira) in Kaufbeuren and removed electricity generation products from its range. AquaStar has not been available since 2013 either. A year later, Truma also halted production of the VeGA fuel cell because it was unable to sell significant quantities. As part of its internationalisation, Truma established two subsidiaries – one in the USA and one in China. Truma introduced AquaGo for the North American market. At the touch of a button, the instant water heater produces an endless flow of hot water at a constant temperature.

=== 2015 to today ===
In 2015, the company laid the foundations for digital networking in recreational vehicles with the Truma iNet System, which enables Truma heaters and air conditioning systems to be controlled remotely with a smartphone or tablet via the Truma App. That same year, Alexander Wottrich came on board as managing director of the Truma Group to manage the family-owned company in the third generation. As deputy managing director, Renate Schimmer-Wottrich supports her son in his work and remains chair of the advisory board. The continuous development of new technologies was honoured in 2013, 2015 and 2017, when Truma received the "Top 100" award as one of the most innovative SMEs in Germany. On 1 January 2018 Alexander Wottrich additionally took over the position of Technical CEO which means he will be heading Research & Development and Supply Chain Management. In the same year Truma receives the Top Job award, making it one of the best employers in German SMEs.

== Products ==
As a manufacturer of leisure products for recreational vehicles Truma offers heating and air conditioning systems, hot water boilers, maneuvering systems, gas pressure regulators, a fuel cell and products for energy and gas supply. The Truma iNet system digitally networks all iNet-capable devices, such as heaters and air conditioning systems, allowing these to be controlled per smartphone when on the go.

== Awards ==
=== Company ===
- Top 100 Innovator 2013
- Top 100 Innovator 2015
- Top 100 Innovator 2017
- Top Job Award 2018
- German Camping Prize for Renate Schimmer-Wottrich 2016
- CTJ Meilenstein for Renate Schimmer-Wottrich 2018

=== Design ===
- Reddot Design Award 2018 LevelControl
- Reddot Design Award 2014 Mover XT
- Caravaning Design Award 2012/2013 Aventa eco and LevelCheck
- Reddot Design Award 2013 LevelCheck and VeGA
- Reddot Design Award 2012 Aventa eco
- Reddot Design Award Combi 2007
- Reddot Design Award 2006

=== Products ===
Truma iNet System

- European Innovation Award 2016 (Truma iNet System)
- DCC technic award 2017

Heaters

- Promobil, The best brands, 1st in the years 2006 - 2012, 2014, 2016 - 2019
- Reisemobil International, König Kunde Award, 2nd in the years 2009 - 2014, 2016 - 2018
- European Innovation Award 2017 (Truma VarioHeat)

Air conditions

- European Innovation Award 2019 (Truma Aventa compact)
- Promobil, The best brands, 2nd in the years 2010 - 2012, 2014, 2018, 2019
- Reisemobil International, König Kunde Award, 2nd in the years 2009 - 2014, 1st 2016 - 2018
- Camping, Cars & Caravans, König Kunde Award, 1st in the years 2009 - 2015, 2018, 2nd in the years 2016, 2017
- Caravaning, The best brands, 1st 2015

Manoeuvering systems

- Test winner Truma Mover SE R, Caravaning 2012
- Camping, Cars & Caravan, König Kunde Award, 1st in the years 2009 - 2010, 2012 - 2014, 2nd 2011, 2016, 2017
- Caravaning, The best brands, 1st in the years 2008 - 2012 and 2014, 2nd 2018, 2019

Gas supply

- Test winner LevelCheck, Reisemobil International and Camping, Cars & Caravans 2012
- DCC technic award 2012 Mono/Duo Control CS
- European Innovation Award 2018 (Truma LevelControl)

Energy management

- Promobil, The best brands, 3rd 2014, 2nd 2018
- Bavarian Energy Award 2008 for VeGA
- F-cell Award 2007 for VeGA

* “Best Water Heater Brands in Canada” - Tips and brand reviews from Northfield Mechanical Services.
