= Hohenschäftlarn station =

Railway station in Bavaria

Hohenschäftlarn
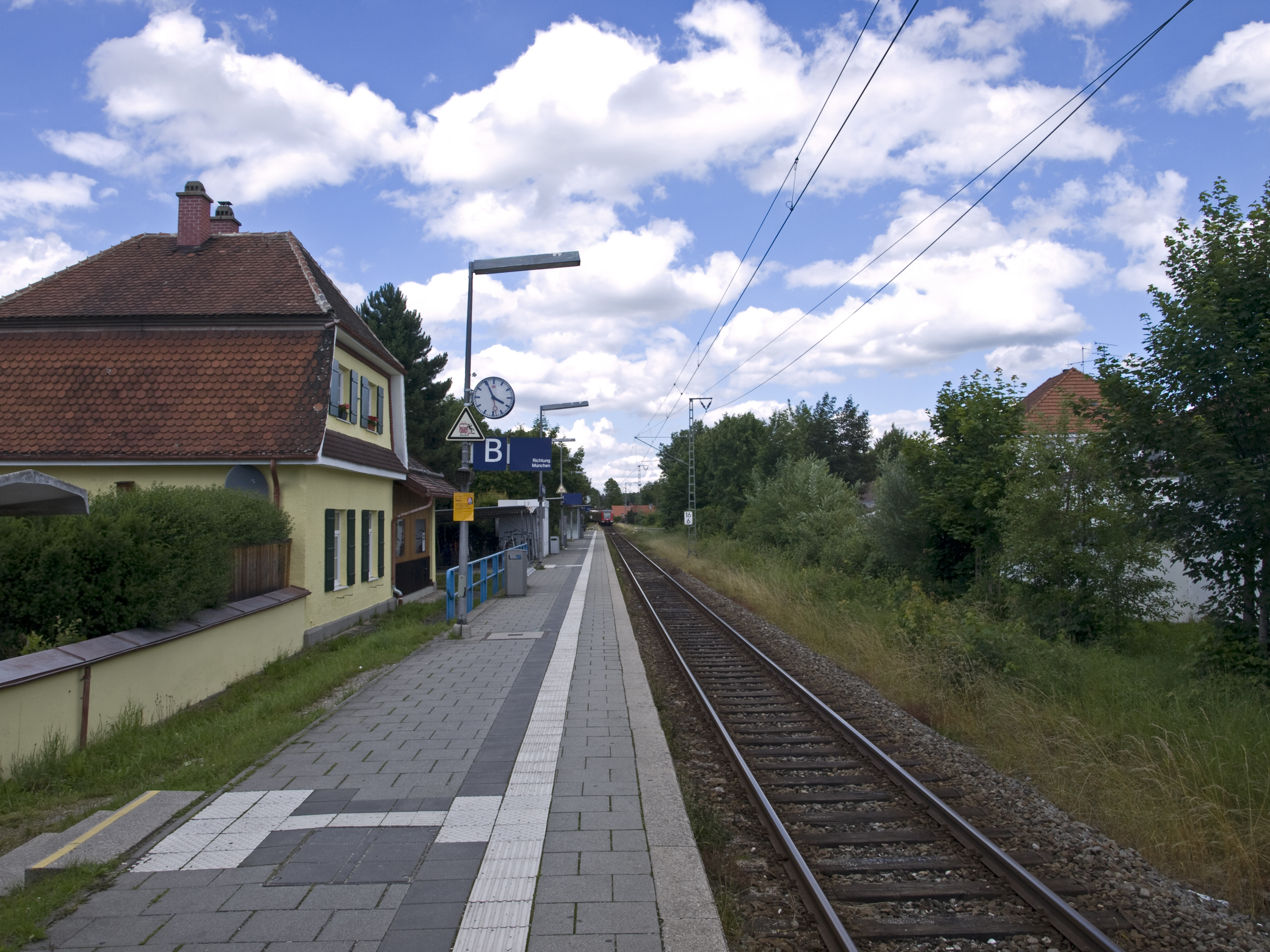
- The station in 2015

General information
- Location: Schäftlarn, Bavaria; Germany
- Coordinates: 47°59′29″N 11°27′27″E
- Owner: DB Netz
- Operator: DB Station&Service
- Lines: Isar Valley line (KBS 999.7)
- Distance: 16.6 km (10.3 mi) from Munich Isartalbf
- Platforms: 1 side platform
- Tracks: 1
- Train operators: S-Bahn München
- Connections: 904

Other information
- Station code: 2858
- DS100 code: MHSL
- IBNR: 8002955
- Category: 6
- Fare zone: 1 and 2 (MVV)

Services
Preceding station	Munich S-Bahn	Following station
Ebenhausen-Schäftlarn towards Wolfratshausen	S7	Baierbrunn towards München Hbf
Location

Hohenschäftlarn station (German: Haltepunkt Hohenschäftlarn) is a railway station in the municipality of Schäftlarn, in Bavaria, Germany. It is located on the Isar Valley line of Deutsche Bahn.

== Services ==
As of the December 2021 timetable change, the following services stop at Hohenschäftlarn:

- S7: two trains per hour between Wolfratshausen and Höhenkirchen-Siegertsbrunn; some trains continue from Höhenkirchen-Siegertsbrunn to Kreuzstraße.
