= Icking =

- Municipality
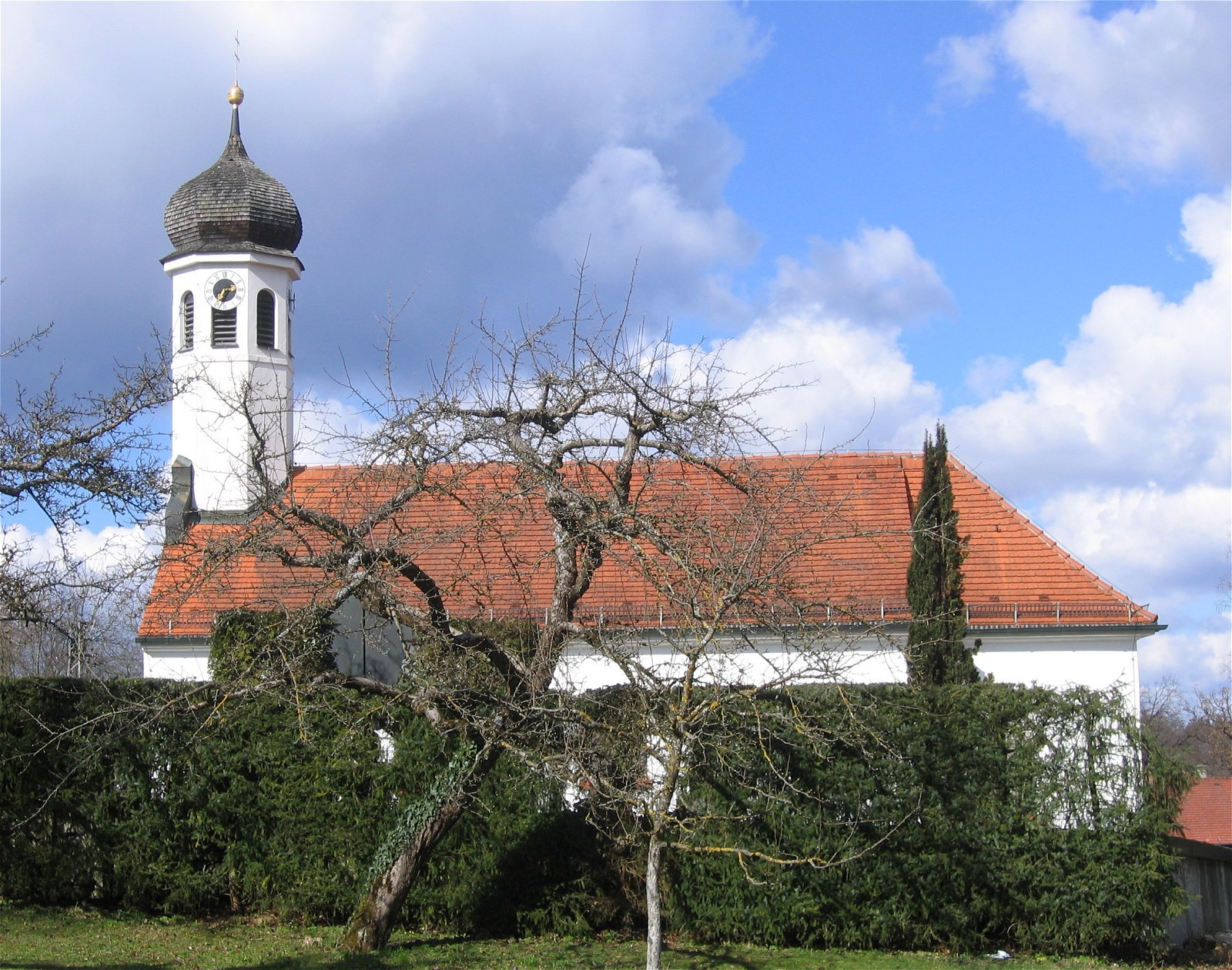
- Church of Saint Anian in Irschenhausen

- Coat of arms

- Location of Icking within Bad Tölz-Wolfratshausen district
- Interactive map of Icking
- Location within Germany Location within Bavaria
- Coordinates: 47°57′N 11°26′E
- Country: Germany
- State: Bavaria
- Admin. region: Oberbayern
- District: Bad Tölz-Wolfratshausen

Government
  - Mayor (2020–26): Verena Reithmann

Area
  - Total: 16.99 km^{2} (6.56 sq mi)
- Elevation: 636 m (2,087 ft)

Population (2025-12-31)
  - Total: 3,651
  - Density: 214.9/km^{2} (556.6/sq mi)
- Time zone: UTC+01:00 (CET)
  - Summer (DST): UTC+02:00 (CEST)
- Postal codes: 82057
- Dialling codes: 08178
- Vehicle registration: TÖL
- Website: www.icking.de

Icking is a municipality in the district of Bad Tölz-Wolfratshausen in Bavaria in Germany.

== People ==
- Anita Augspurg, lived in Icking from 1916 until she fled the Nazis.
- Dieter Borsche, actor, lived in Icking in the beginning of the '60s.
- Bernhard Buttersack, painter, died in 1925 in Icking.
- Karl Wilhelm Diefenbach, painter.
- Klaus Doldinger, jazz musician.
- O. W. Fischer, Austrian actor, lived in Irschenhausen in the '60s.
- Gert Fröbe, actor, buried in Icking in 1988.
- Max W. Kimmich, scriptwriter, lived in Icking until he died.
- D. H. Lawrence, English writer, lived in Icking in September 1927.
- Golo Mann, author and philosopher.
- Erich von Manstein, Generalfeldmarschall, died in 1973 in Icking.
- Leo Geyr von Schweppenburg died in 1974 in Irschenhausen.

== Geography ==
=== Townships ===
It consists of:

- Attenhausen
- Dorfen
- Holzen
- Icking
- Irschenhausen
- Meilenberg
- Obere Alpe
- Schützenried
- Schlederloh
- Spatzenloh
- Wadlhausen
- Walchstadt

== History ==
The region belonged to the bursary of Munich and the district court of Wolfratshausen in the electorate of Bavaria and was a lordship of Schäftlarn until its secularization. In 1818, Icking became an autonomous political community following Bavaria's administrative reform.

== Public facilities ==
=== Educational institutions ===
The Rainer-Maria-Rilke Gymnasium Icking was founded in 1921 through a parent initiative. On 23 August 1960, a contract was signed, making it a state institution. Today the school features three educational paths, focusing on humanities and the classics, the sciences, and modern languages. Current enrollment is around 900 students.

== Transport ==
Icking station was opened on 27 July 1891 with this section of the Isar Valley Railway and is served at 20-minute intervals by line S 7 of the Munich S-Bahn between Wolfratshausen and Kreuzstrasse.

== Recreational facilities ==
Beach volleyball complex, Ski jump (out of commission), tennis courts, soccer field, gymnasiums at the elementary school and Gymnasium.
