= Munich (district) =

Coordinates: 48°00′N 11°40′E

- District
- Flag Coat of arms
- Country: Germany
- State: Bavaria
- Adm. region: Upper Bavaria
- Capital: Munich

Government
  - District admin.: Christoph Göbel (CSU)

Area
  - Total: 667.27 km^{2} (257.63 sq mi)

Population (31 December 2023)
  - Total: 358,480
  - Density: 540/km^{2} (1,400/sq mi)
- Time zone: UTC+01:00 (CET)
  - Summer (DST): UTC+02:00 (CEST)
- Vehicle registration: M (followed by one letter)
- Website: www.landkreis-muenchen.de

Munich (German: Landkreis München) is a Landkreis (district) in Bavaria, Germany. It borders (from the north and clockwise) the districts of Dachau, Freising, Erding, Ebersberg, Rosenheim, Miesbach, Bad Tölz-Wolfratshausen, Starnberg, Fürstenfeldbruck, and almost encircles (except for the west and northwest sides) the district-free city of Munich itself, which is the district seat.

== History ==
The history of the region is connected to the city of Munich.

The district was established in 1852 and underwent several changes due to the ongoing incorporation of municipalities into the city of Munich. In 1972 the constant shrinking of the district was compensated by adding nine municipalities from the former district of Wolfratshausen.

== Geography ==
The district is located in the east and the south of the city Munich, mostly covering the moraine plain around Munich. In the south of the district the foothills of the Alps start, which also contain the highest elevation of the district, two hills 703 m above sea level in the municipality Schäftlarn. The lowest elevation with 471 m is near Unterschleißheim in the north of the district. The main river is the Isar, which also flows through the city of Munich.

== Coat of arms ==
The left half of the coat of arms show the Bavarian blue-and-white lozenge symbols. The black and gold (mostly simplified to yellow) colors in the right half are the colors of the city Munich. On top is a wavy line, which symbolizes the river Isar.

== Towns and municipalities ==
Clickable map of towns and municipalities in the district

Towns
1. Garching
2. Haar
3. Unterschleißheim
Municipalities
1. Aschheim
2. Aying
3. Baierbrunn
4. Brunnthal
5. Feldkirchen
6. Gräfelfing
7. Grasbrunn
8. Grünwald
9. Hohenbrunn
10. Höhenkirchen-Siegertsbrunn
11. Ismaning
12. Kirchheim
13. Neubiberg

14. Neuried
15. Oberhaching
16. Oberschleißheim
17. Ottobrunn
18. Planegg
19. Pullach
20. Putzbrunn
21. Sauerlach
22. Schäftlarn
23. Straßlach-Dingharting
24. Taufkirchen
25. Unterföhring
26. Unterhaching

== Government ==
The district is administered by the Landratsamt München and politically led by the Kreistag.
