= Neuried, Bavaria =

Neuried
- Municipality
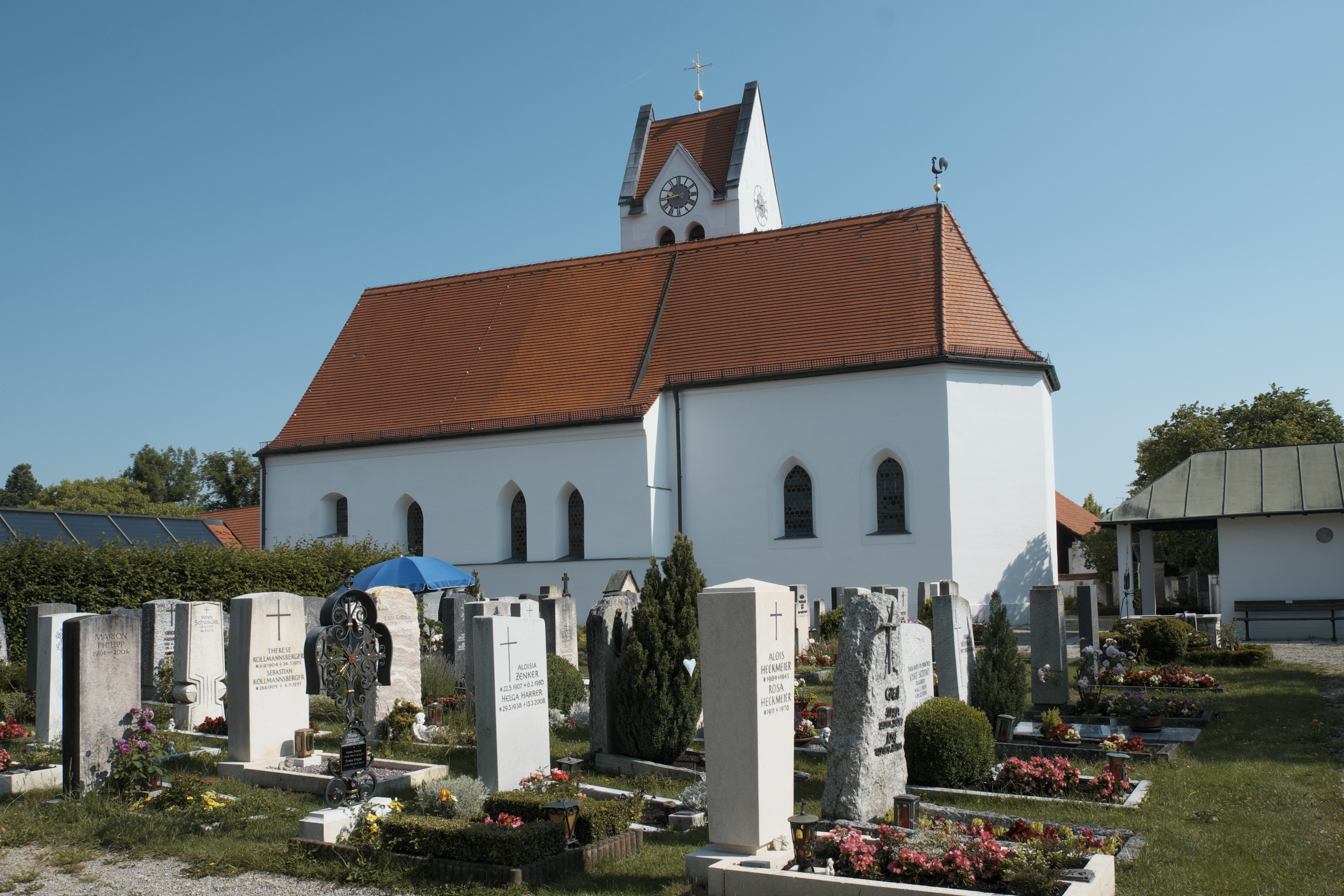
- Church of Saint Nicholas

- Coat of arms

- Location of Neuried within Munich district
- Interactive map of Neuried
- Location within Germany Location within Bavaria
- Coordinates: 48°5′36″N 11°27′57″E
- Country: Germany
- State: Bavaria
- Admin. region: Oberbayern
- District: Munich

Government
  - Mayor (2020–26): Harald Zipfel (SPD)

Area
  - Total: 9.62 km^{2} (3.71 sq mi)
- Elevation: 559 m (1,834 ft)

Population (2025-12-31)
  - Total: 8,790
  - Density: 914/km^{2} (2,370/sq mi)
- Time zone: UTC+01:00 (CET)
  - Summer (DST): UTC+02:00 (CEST)
- Postal codes: 82061
- Dialling codes: 089
- Vehicle registration: M
- Website: www.neuried.de

Neuried (German pronunciation: [ˈnɔʏʁiːt]) is a municipality in the district of Munich in Bavaria in Germany.
