= Höhenkirchen-Siegertsbrunn =

- Municipality
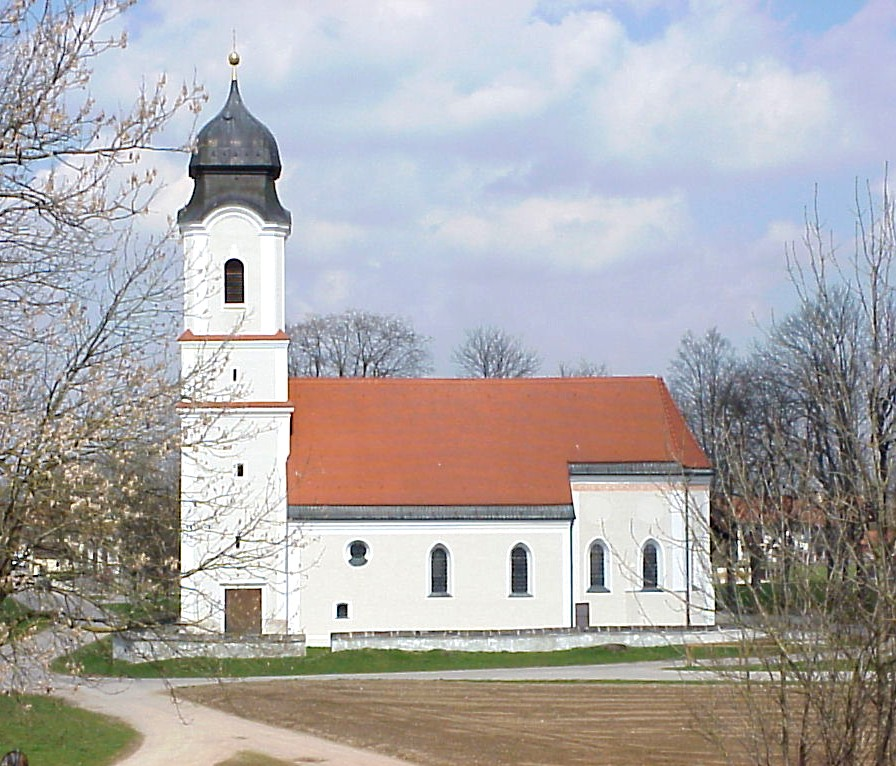
- Church of Saint Leonard

- Coat of arms

- Location of Höhenkirchen-Siegertsbrunn within Munich district
- Interactive map of Höhenkirchen-Siegertsbrunn
- Location within Germany Location within Bavaria
- Coordinates: 48°01′N 11°44′E
- Country: Germany
- State: Bavaria
- Admin. region: Oberbayern
- District: Munich
- Subdivisions: 3 Ortsteile

Government
  - Mayor (2026–32): Mindy Konwitschny (SPD)

Area
  - Total: 23.77 km^{2} (9.18 sq mi)
- Elevation: 586 m (1,923 ft)

Population (2025-12-31)
  - Total: 11,043
  - Density: 464.6/km^{2} (1,203/sq mi)
- Time zone: UTC+01:00 (CET)
  - Summer (DST): UTC+02:00 (CEST)
- Postal codes: 85635
- Dialling codes: 08102
- Vehicle registration: M
- Website: www.hoehenkirchen-siegertsbrunn.de

Höhenkirchen-Siegertsbrunn (German pronunciation: [høːənˈkɪʁçn̩ ˈziːɡɐtsˌbʁʊn]) is a municipality in Upper Bavaria, situated south of Munich. It is one of the municipalities with the longest names in Germany, the longest being Hellschen-Heringsand-Unterschaar.

== Geography ==
Höhenkirchen-Siegertsbrunn lies 20 kilometers south-east of Munich.

== History ==
Höhenkirchen-Siegertsbrunn is a combination of two villages that were once independent, as can be seen on old maps. (see: BayernAtlas) Höhenkirchen and Siegertsbrunn were first mentioned in 1020 and 1048 respectively. Höhenkirchen was known as Marchwartsbrunn until around the 12th century, named after its founders Marchwart and Sigoho. The two names ending in -brunn (which means well in German) have to do with the deep wells, up to 30 metres deep, that were dug to make it possible for people to live there.

With the arrival of a railway connection in 1904, industry and commerce in Höhenkirchen grew rapidly until the 1960s. The population continued to grow after 1945 due to the expulsion of Germans to other European countries after the Second World War.

The two villages were amalgamated into their present form in 1978.

== Heraldry ==
Coat of arms of Höhenkirchen-Siegertsbrunn	Blazon: Under a red chief, containing a silver bend sinister charged with a black arrow, in silver a rooted green fir tree. Explanation of coat of arms: The fir tree symbolizes the origins of Höhenkirchen as a High Medieval settlement cleared in the forest southeast of Munich. The Höhenkirchen Forest takes its name from the municipality. The diagonal bar with an arrow in the chief of the shield corresponds to the coat of arms of the Schrenck family of Egmating. In 1630, the castle owner Johann Heinrich Schrenck obtained manorial privileges for his estate in Höhenkirchen. This coat of arms was adopted by the former municipality of Höhenkirchen, and it has been valid for Höhenkirchen-Siegertsbrunn since the municipal reorganization.

== Transport ==
In 1972, the Höhenkirchen-Siegertsbrunn station was erected, connecting the two villages to the Munich-Giesing–Kreuzstraße line of the Munich S-Bahn.

== Politics ==
The municipality has a council of 24 people plus the mayor. The deputy mayor (or vice-mayor) is also a member of the council. The council usually meets once a month. Municipal elections in Bavaria are held every six years, with the current term running until from 2026 to 2032.

The current mayor is Mindy Konwitschny of the SPD and her deputy is Andrea Hanisch (Unabhängige Bürger).

Total 24 seats
- Christian Social Union in Bavaria: 9
- Alliance 90/The Greens: 6
- Social Democratic Party of Germany: 4
- Unabhängige Bürger: 3
- Allgemeine freie Wählergemeinschaft: 2

== International relations ==
=== Twin towns — Sister cities ===
Höhenkirchen-Siegertsbrunn is twinned with:

- Montemarciano, Italy since 2005
- Chéroy, France since 14 May 1967

A sign mentioning the twinnings is visible when entering the village.

== Literature ==
- "Chronik eines Dorfes" by Rudolf Stingl
- "Heimatbuch von Siegertsbrunn" by Wolfgang Bethke.
