= Solalinden =

Village in Bavaria, Germany

Coordinates: 48°06′N 11°43′E

Solalinden is a small village south-east of Munich, Germany. The village is a part of Putzbrunn Gemeinde, i.e. municipality.
