= Grasbrunn =

- Municipality
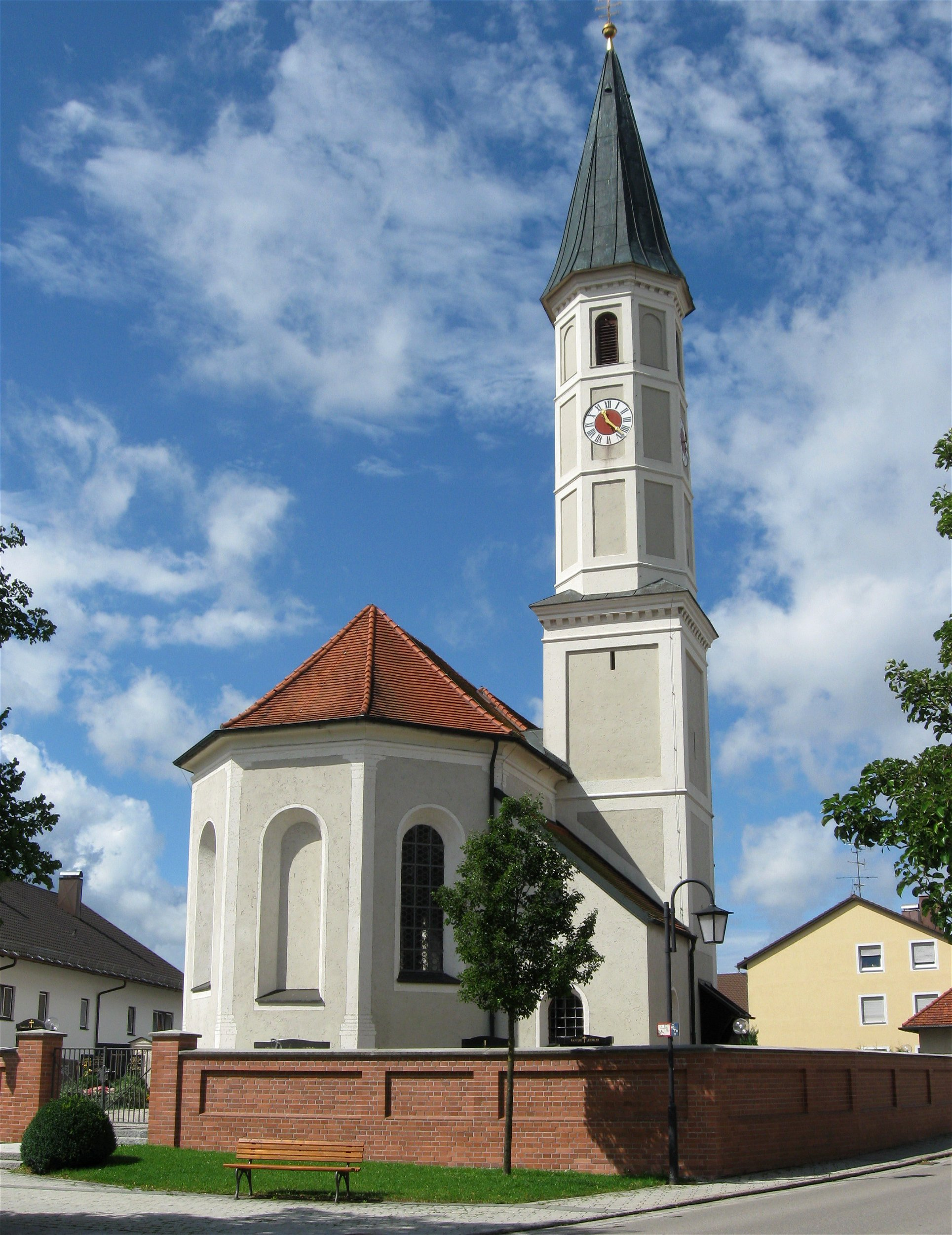
- Church of Saint Ulrich

- Coat of arms

- Location of Grasbrunn within Munich district
- Interactive map of Grasbrunn
- Location within Germany Location within Bavaria
- Coordinates: 48°4′44″N 11°44′37″E
- Country: Germany
- State: Bavaria
- Admin. region: Oberbayern
- District: Munich
- Subdivisions: 5 Gemeindeteile

Government
  - Mayor (2020–26): Klaus Korneder (SPD)

Area
  - Total: 26.39 km^{2} (10.19 sq mi)
- Elevation: 556 m (1,824 ft)

Population (2025-12-31)
  - Total: 6,511
  - Density: 246.7/km^{2} (639.0/sq mi)
- Time zone: UTC+01:00 (CET)
  - Summer (DST): UTC+02:00 (CEST)
- Postal codes: 85630
- Dialling codes: 089
- Vehicle registration: M
- Website: www.grasbrunn.de

Grasbrunn (German pronunciation: [ˈɡʁaːsbʁʊn]) is a municipality in the district of Munich in Bavaria in Germany.
