= Putzbrunn =

- Municipality
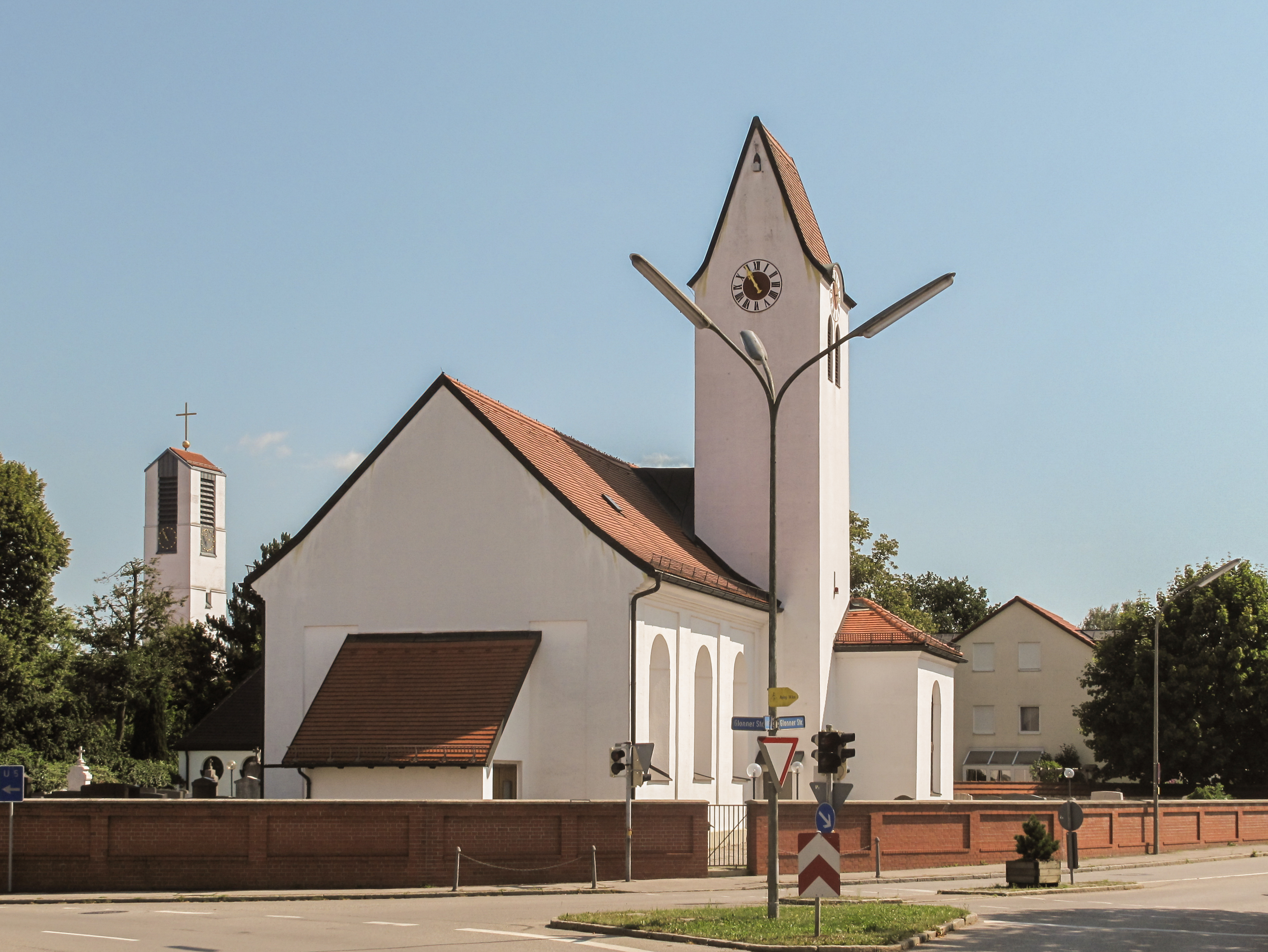
- Church of Saint Stephen

- Coat of arms

- Location of Putzbrunn within Munich district
- Interactive map of Putzbrunn
- Location within Germany Location within Bavaria
- Coordinates: 48°4′N 11°43′E
- Country: Germany
- State: Bavaria
- Admin. region: Upper Bavaria
- District: Munich
- Founded: ~996

Government
  - Mayor (2024–30): Edwin Klostermeier (SPD)

Area
  - Total: 11.17 km^{2} (4.31 sq mi)
- Elevation: 553 m (1,814 ft)

Population (2025-12-31)
  - Total: 7,010
  - Density: 628/km^{2} (1,630/sq mi)
- Time zone: UTC+01:00 (CET)
  - Summer (DST): UTC+02:00 (CEST)
- Postal codes: 85640
- Dialling codes: 089
- Vehicle registration: M
- Website: www.putzbrunn.de

Putzbrunn (German pronunciation: [ˈpʊtsbʁʊn]) is a municipality in the district of Munich, Bavaria in Germany.

== Geography ==
Putzbrunn belongs to the area called "Landkreis München", the area around Munich. Villages in the municipality include Solalinden.

== Economy ==
The largest employer in Putzbrunn is the manufacturing company W. L. Gore & Associates, with 900 people working in five buildings.
