= Strasslach-Dingharting =

- Municipality
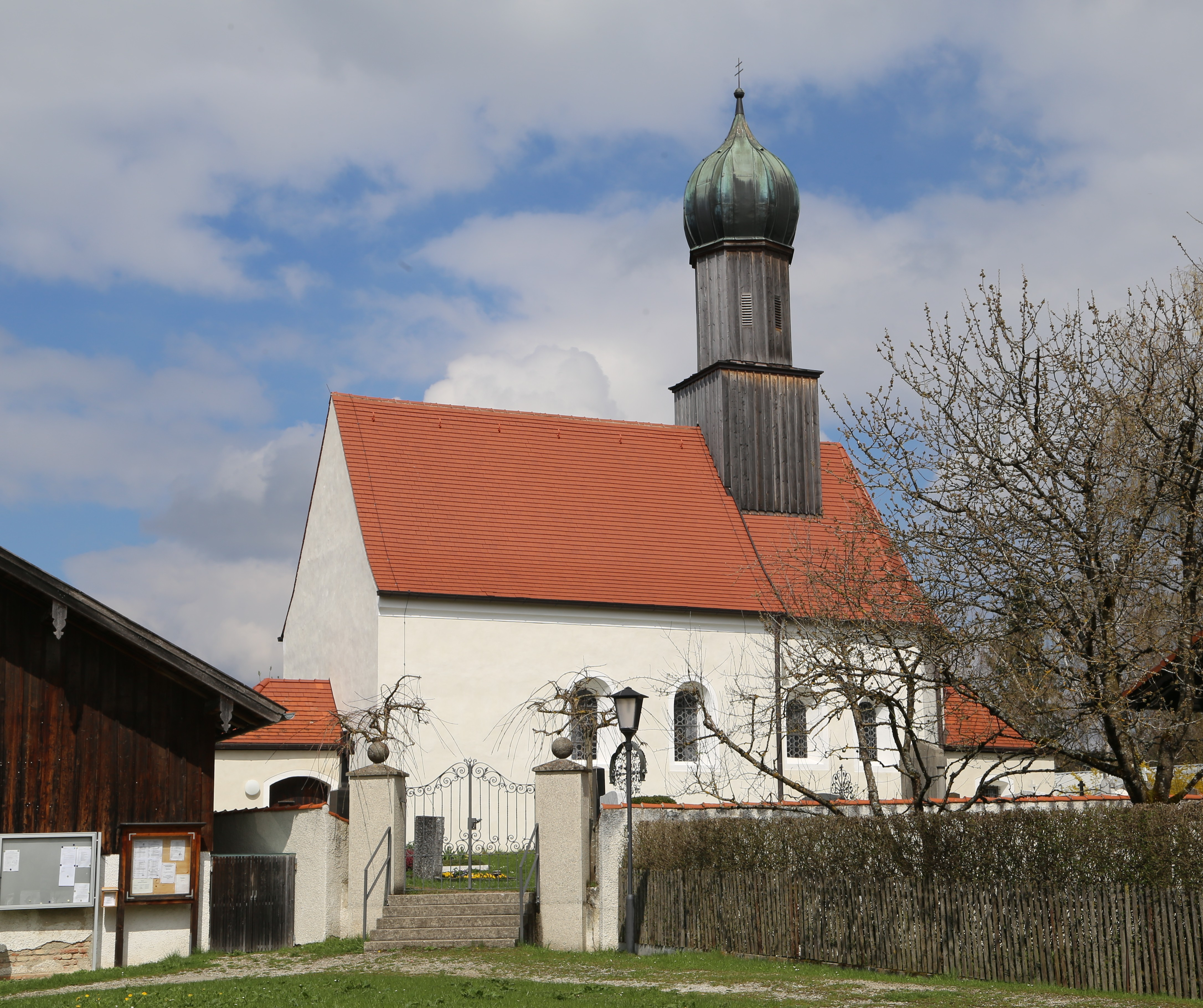
- Church of Saint Martin

- Coat of arms

- Location of Strasslach-Dingharting within Munich district
- Interactive map of Strasslach-Dingharting
- Location within Germany Location within Bavaria
- Coordinates: 48°00′N 11°31′E
- Country: Germany
- State: Bavaria
- Admin. region: Oberbayern
- District: Munich

Government
  - Mayor (2020–26): Hans Sienerth

Area
  - Total: 28.34 km^{2} (10.94 sq mi)
- Elevation: 635 m (2,083 ft)

Population (2025-12-31)
  - Total: 3,250
  - Density: 115/km^{2} (297/sq mi)
- Time zone: UTC+01:00 (CET)
  - Summer (DST): UTC+02:00 (CEST)
- Postal codes: 82064
- Dialling codes: 08170
- Vehicle registration: M
- Website: www.strasslach-dingharting.de

Strasslach-Dingharting (German: Straßlach-Dingharting) (German pronunciation: [ˈʃtʁaːslax ˈdɪŋhaʁtɪŋ]) is a municipality in the district of Munich in Bavaria in Germany.
