= Schäftlarn Abbey =

Coordinates: 47°58′43″N 11°28′01″E

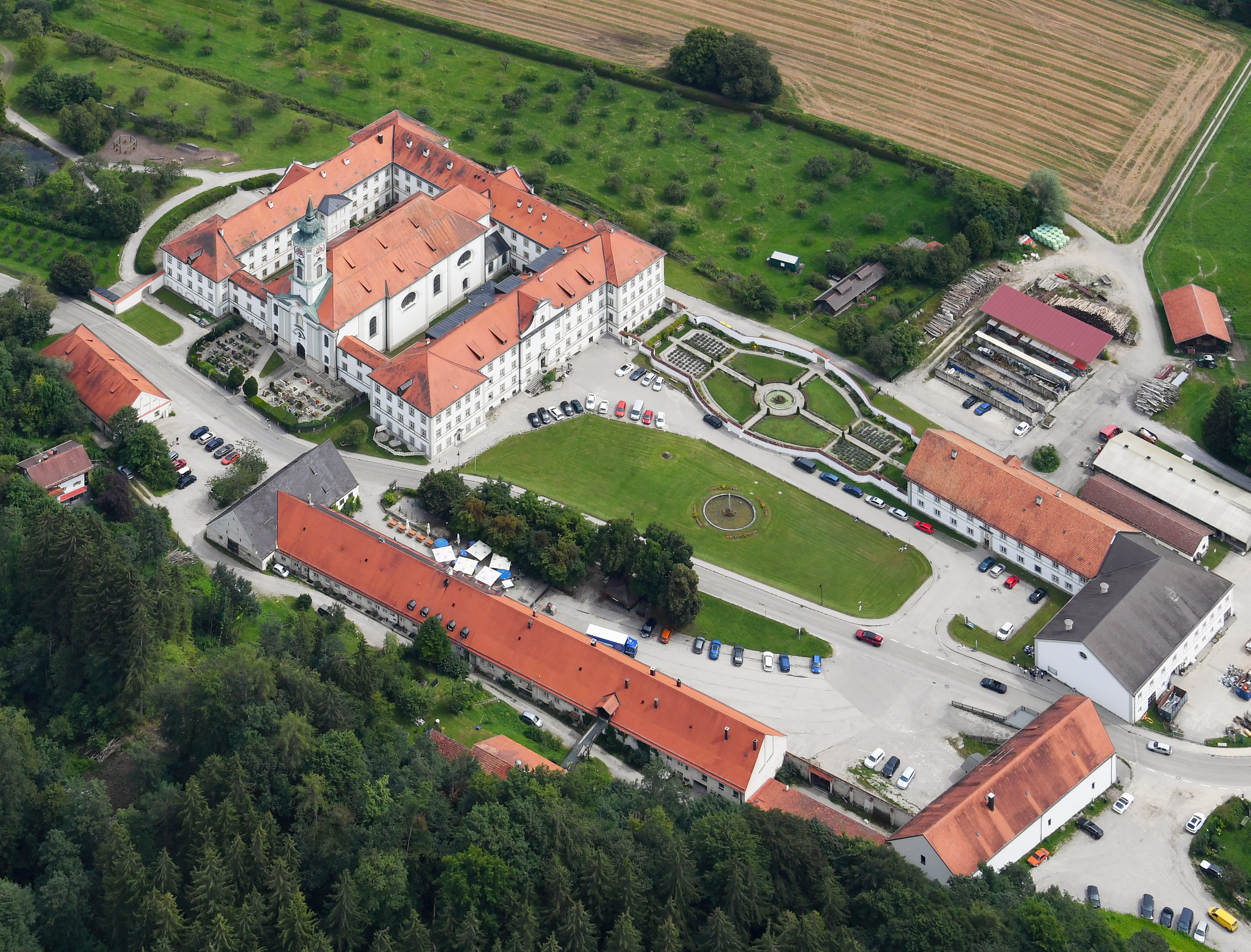
Aerial view of Schäftlarn Abbey

Schäftlarn Abbey (Kloster Schäftlarn) is a Benedictine monastery on the Isar in Schäftlarn, south of Munich in Bavaria, Germany.

== History ==
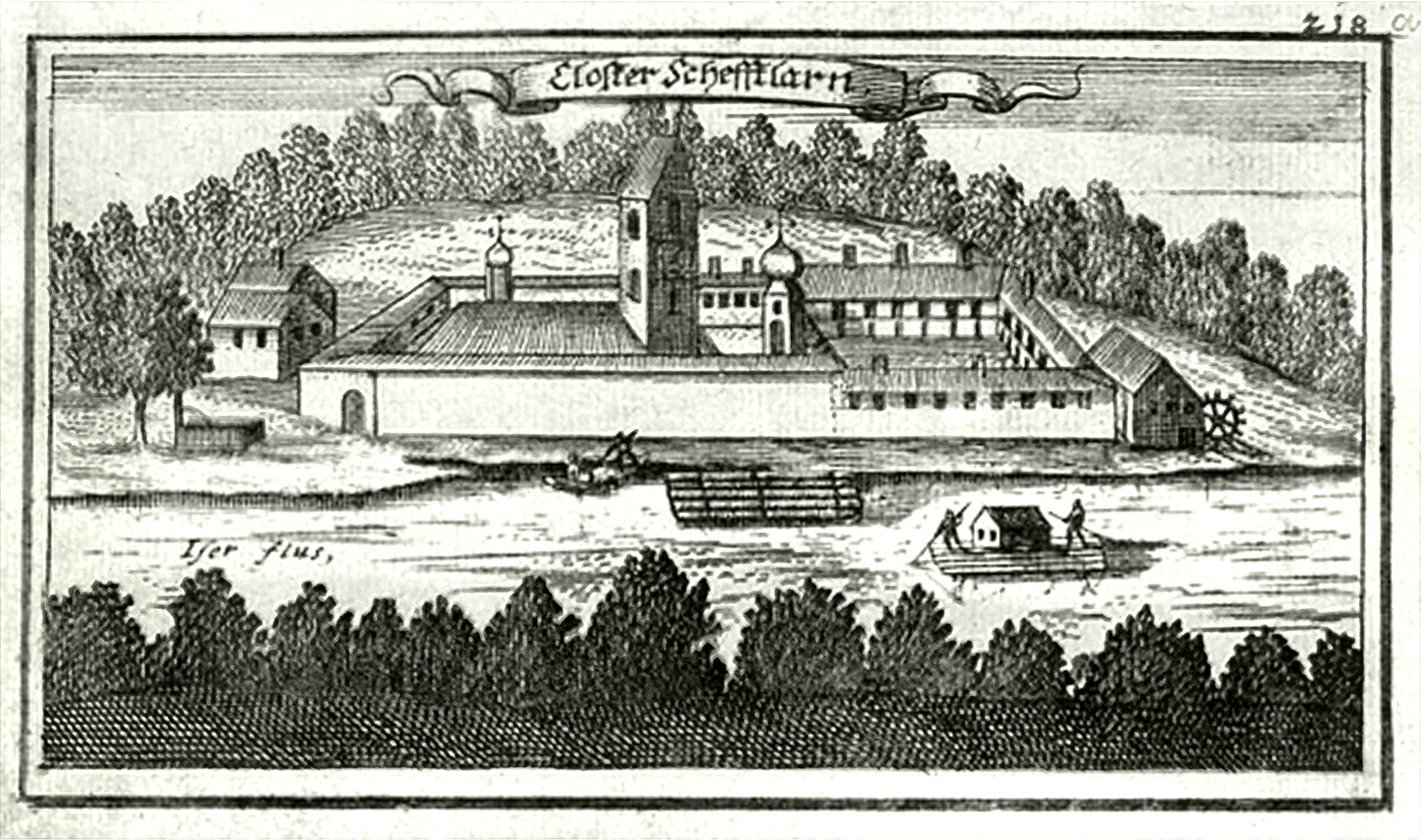
Engraving of Schäftlarn Abbey from the "Churbaierische Atlas" of Anton Wilhelm Ertl, 1690

The monastery was founded in 762 by Waltrich, a priest of noble family, on his own land. The monastery was dedicated to Saint Dionysius of Paris. The first monks came from the cathedral monastery of Saint Mary and Saint Corbinian in Freising. In the tenth century the monastery was turned into a house for lay canons.

During the next two centuries the monastery grew as a result of various gifts and endowments (among them the estates of Schwabing and Hesselohe). In 955 the monastery was destroyed by the Hungarians who were then making marauding incursions into Germany.

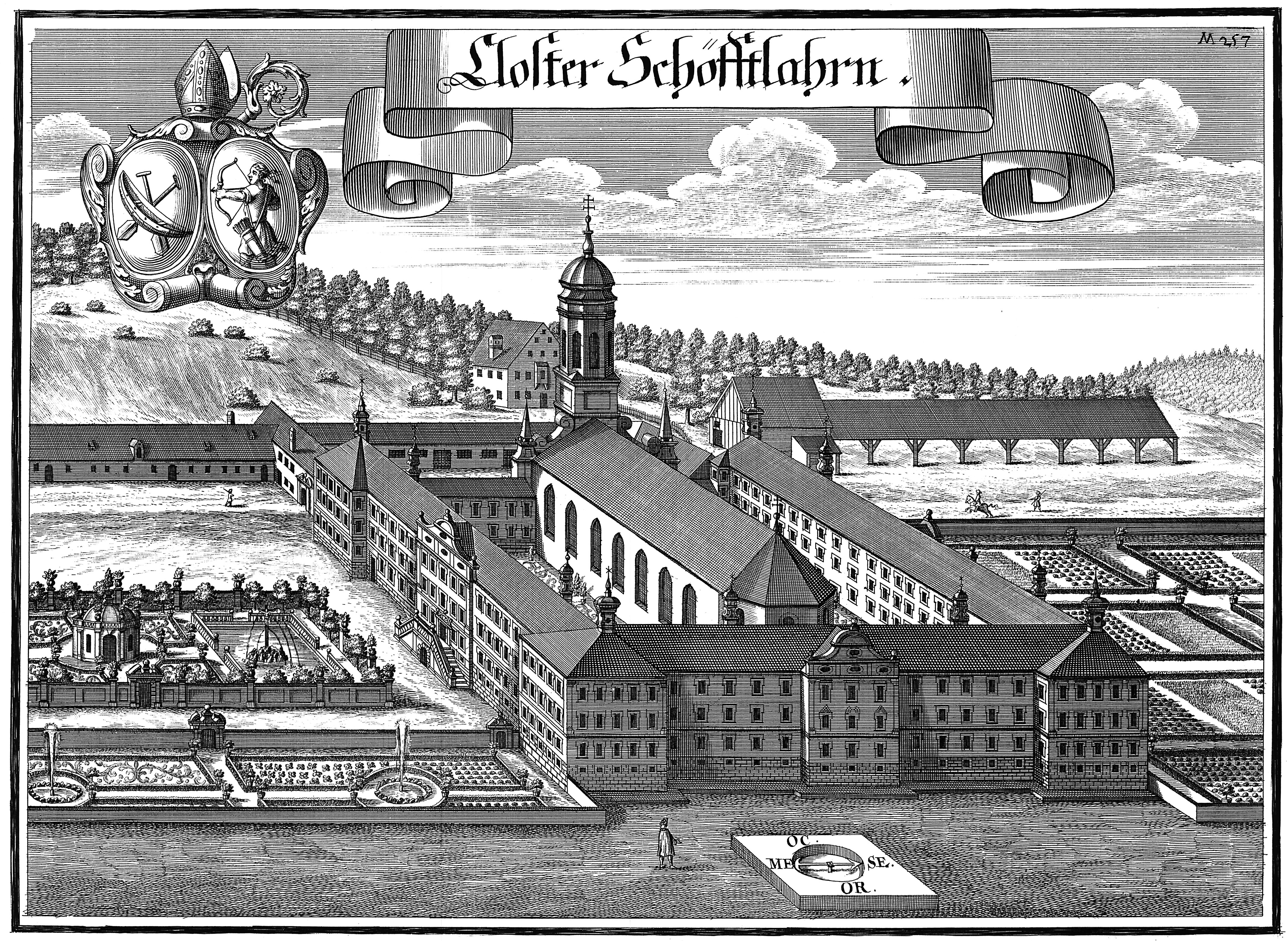
The new baroque buildings; copperplate engraving by Michael Wening, 1701

In 1140, Bishop Otto of Freising refounded it as a Premonstratensian monastery, with canons from Ursberg Abbey. Schäftlarn reached a high point in the cultivation of arts in the eighteenth century. It was dissolved during the secularisation of Bavaria in 1803.

In 1866 King Ludwig II of Bavaria restored possession to the Benedictines, who set up a secondary school ("Gymnasium") here.

== Present day ==
As of 2022, there were fifteen monks at the abbey. The abbey is a member of the Bavarian Congregation of the Benedictine Confederation. The abbey church is dedicated to Saint Dionysius and Saint Juliana.

The monks who live here carry out forestry, have a distillery and an apiary. For over thirty-five years, the abbey has hosted a summer concert series, featuring famous soloists and an orchestra composed of musicians from the great Munich concerts halls. Schäftlarn Abbey is the starting point for the first stage of a Route of Santiago de Compostela.

In February 2022, two S-Bahn trains collided head-on, resulting in one fatality and at least eighteen injured, some seriously. The injured passengers were brought to the nearby abbey.

== School ==
The school was closed between 1941 and 1945 by the National Socialists. Immediately after the war the school, which is private, was re-opened as a "Progymnasium", that is to say, only for German forms 5 to 10 (equivalent to the Upper Fifth form), to the year before the Abitur. Abitur examinations were not conducted in Schäftlarn until 1973. In 2022 the school had just over 500 students, both day pupils (boys and girls) and boarders (boys only). It is widely known throughout Munich. The subway lines S7, as well as the busses 904 and 974 connect the school to the city. Therefore, students come from all over Munich and the suburbs bordering the city.

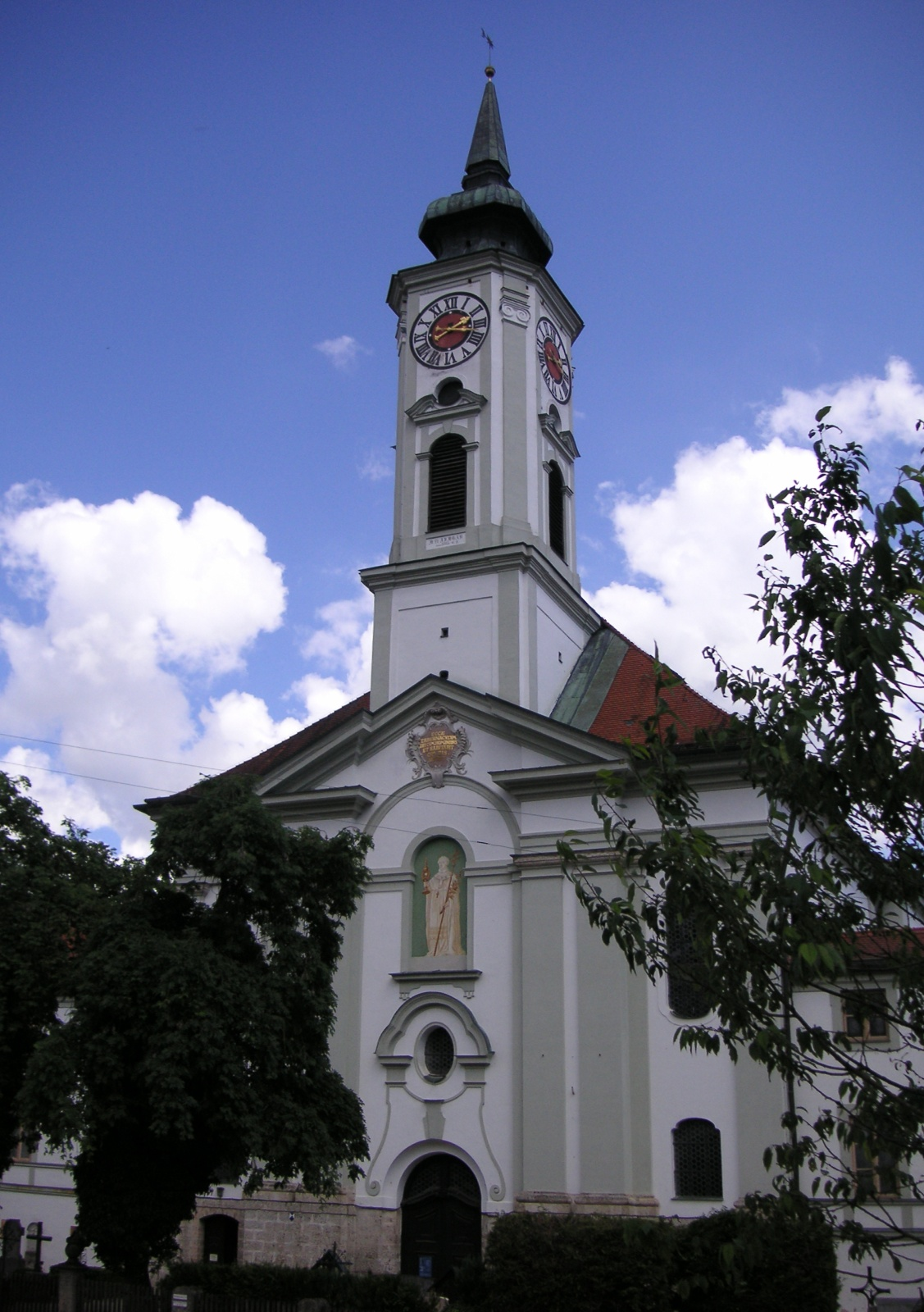
Schäftlarn Abbey

== Architecture ==
The present abbey buildings were constructed in 1707 to plans by Giovanni Antonio Viscardi. The abbey church of Saint Dionysius and Saint Juliana is a beautiful example of the Rococo architectural style. It was begun as a new building from 1733 to 1740 under Francois de Cuvilliés the Elder, and finished during the period from 1751 to 1760 by Johann Georg Gunetzrhainer and Johann Michael Fischer.

From 1754 to 1756, the church was painted and decorated with stucco by Johann Baptist Zimmermann. From 1756 to 1764 Johann Baptist Straub worked on the altars and the chancel. There is also a formal garden here, the "Prelate's Garden", recently restored.

== See also ==
- List of Carolingian monasteries
- Category:Rococo architecture in Germany

== Sources ==
- Winhard, Wolfgang, and Peda, Gregor (nd). Kloster Schäftlarn: Geschichte und Kunst. Kunstverlag Peda Gregor. ISBN 3-927296-80-5
- Mitterer, Sigisbert, 1962. 1200 Jahre Kloster Schäftlarn. Seitz Verlag.
