= Schäftlarn =

- Municipality
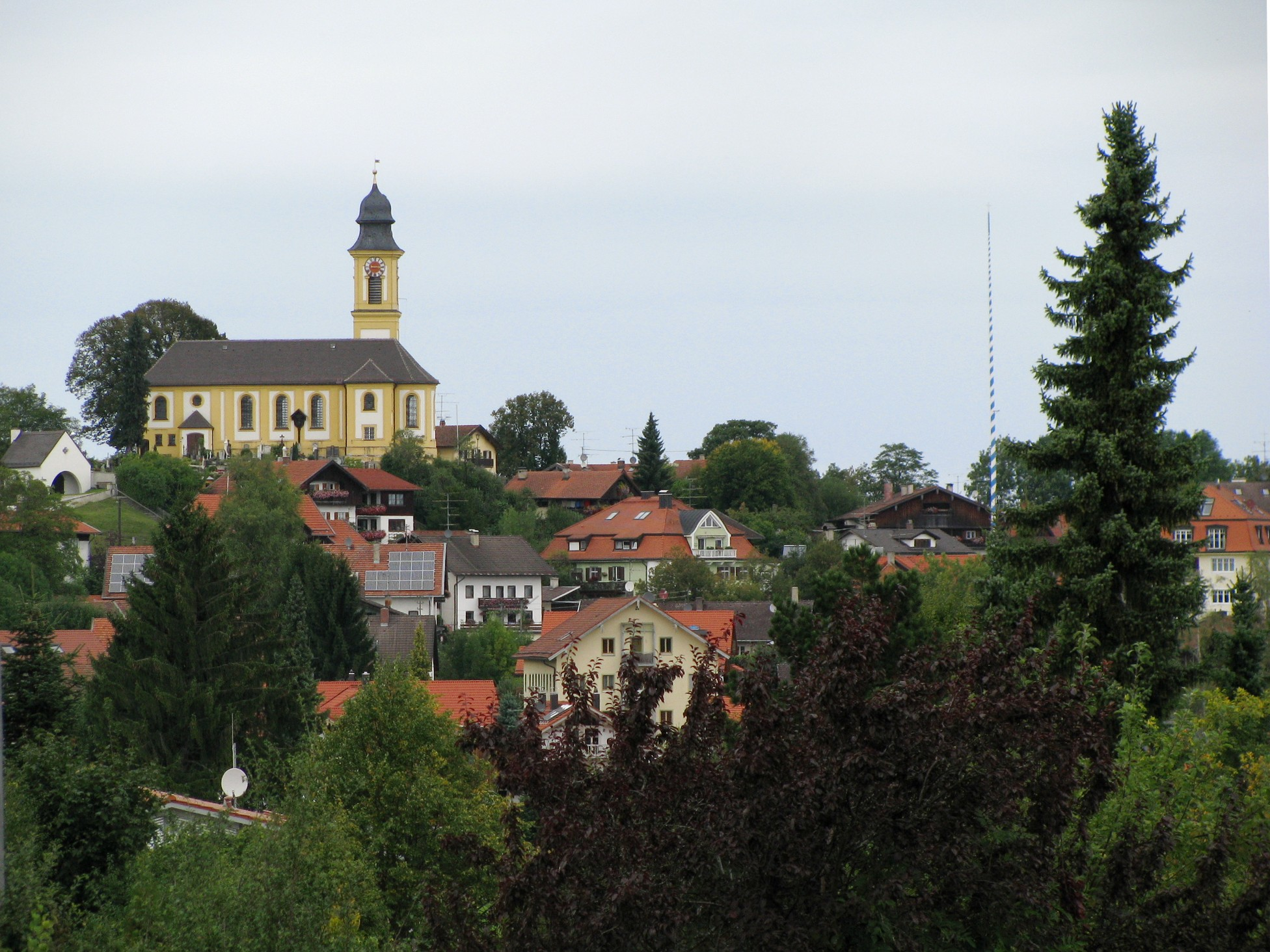
- Hohenschäftlarn

- Coat of arms

- Location of Schäftlarn within Munich district
- Interactive map of Schäftlarn
- Location within Germany Location within Bavaria
- Coordinates: 47°59′6″N 11°27′24″E
- Country: Germany
- State: Bavaria
- Admin. region: Oberbayern
- District: Munich

Government
  - Mayor (2020–26): Christian Fürst (CSU)

Area
  - Total: 16.72 km^{2} (6.46 sq mi)
- Elevation: 692 m (2,270 ft)

Population (2025-12-31)
  - Total: 5,830
  - Density: 349/km^{2} (903/sq mi)
- Time zone: UTC+01:00 (CET)
  - Summer (DST): UTC+02:00 (CEST)
- Postal codes: 82067 & 82069
- Dialling codes: 08178
- Vehicle registration: M
- Website: www.schaeftlarn.de

Schäftlarn (German pronunciation: [ˈʃɛftlaʁn]) is a municipality in the district of Munich in Bavaria in Germany. It consists of the villages Ebenhausen, Hohenschäftlarn, Kloster Schäftlarn, Neufahrn and Zell. The river Isar runs through it. A human settlement with the name "Schäftlarn" does not exist.

The most famous building complex is Schäftlarn Abbey (Kloster).

== History ==
The name Schäftlarn was officially recorded as a municipality in 1873. However, the roots of the place go back much further. Schäftlarn Abbey was founded in the year 762 as a monastery for Benedictine monks. The village of Hohenschäftlarn is first mentioned in documents 778 and belonged to the abbey. The monastery was rebuilt between 1702 and 1760, and the church of St. Georg in the village of Hohenschäftlarn in 1729/30. During the secularisation of Bavaria in 1803, the monastery was dissolved. In 1818, the municipality of Schäftlarn was first established as an independent political entity. In 1866, Ludwig I of Bavaria re-established the monastery and gave it back to the Benedictines, who founded a school there. The village of Zell is first mentioned in documents in the year 1160, but it is probably much older. The first documents about Ebenhausen date back to the year 1130, when it was called Emmenhusen. Neufahrn is first mentioned in 1140.

== Transport ==
The municipality has a railway station, Hohenschäftlarn, on the Isar Valley Railway.
