= Höhenkirchen-Siegertsbrunn station =

Railway station in Germany

Höhenkirchen-Siegertsbrunn
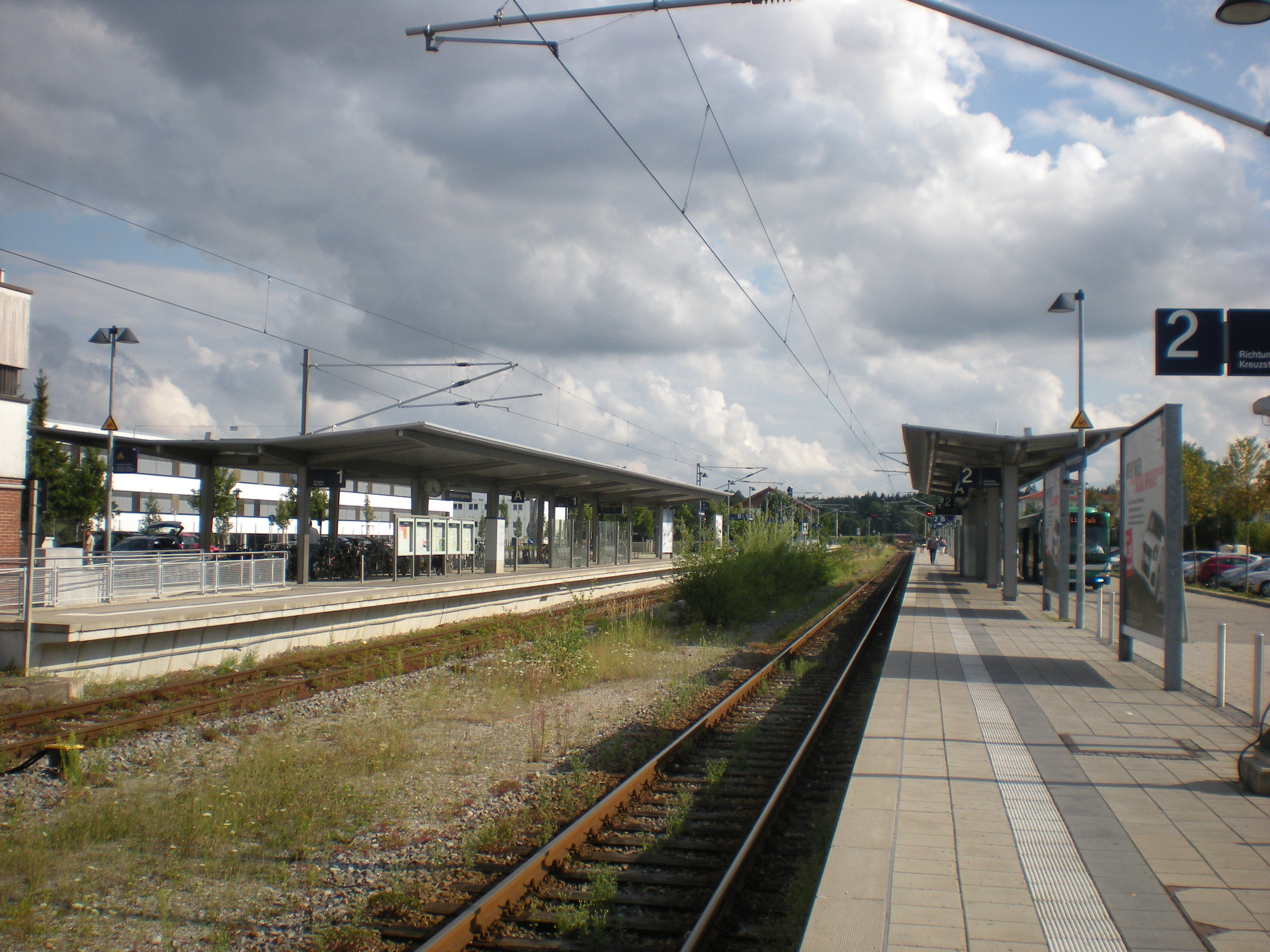

General information
- Location: Höhenkirchen-Siegertsbrunn, Bavaria; Germany
- Coordinates: 48°1′7.7″N 11°43′9.1″E
- Owner: DB Netz
- Operator: DB Station&Service
- Line: Munich–Kreuzstraße (km 11.1)
- Platforms: 2 side platforms
- Tracks: 2
- Connections: 216, 240, 244, 454, 456

Other information
- Station code: 2847
- DS100 code: MHSB
- Category: 5
- Fare zone: : 1 and 2
- Website: www.bahnhof.de

Services
Preceding station	Munich S-Bahn	Following station
Wächterhof towards Weßling	S5	Dürnhaar towards Kreuzstraße
Location
- Location within Bavaria Location within Germany Location within Europe

Höhenkirchen-Siegertsbrunn is a station on the Munich S-Bahn network on the Munich-Giesing–Kreuzstraße railway. It is located in the community of Höhenkirchen-Siegertsbrunn, south-east of Munich. It has two side-platforms with a large distance between the tracks. It is served by line S7 in a twenty-minute rhythm. A third of the outbound trains terminate here, the rest continues further to Aying or Kreuzstraße. Before 2005 the station had one island-platform, which was demolished after the opening of the two side-platforms in 2005. The station is staffed: tickets can be purchased at the DB store. The station facilities are: toilets, a bus stop, bicycle stands and P+R (park and ride). The station is located at the ground level so it is accessible by wheelchair. The north half of both platforms is covered by a roof. The travel time to Marienplatz is approximately 30 minutes.
