= Arnulfstraße =

Street in Munich, Germany

Coordinates: 48.1419°N 11.5575°E

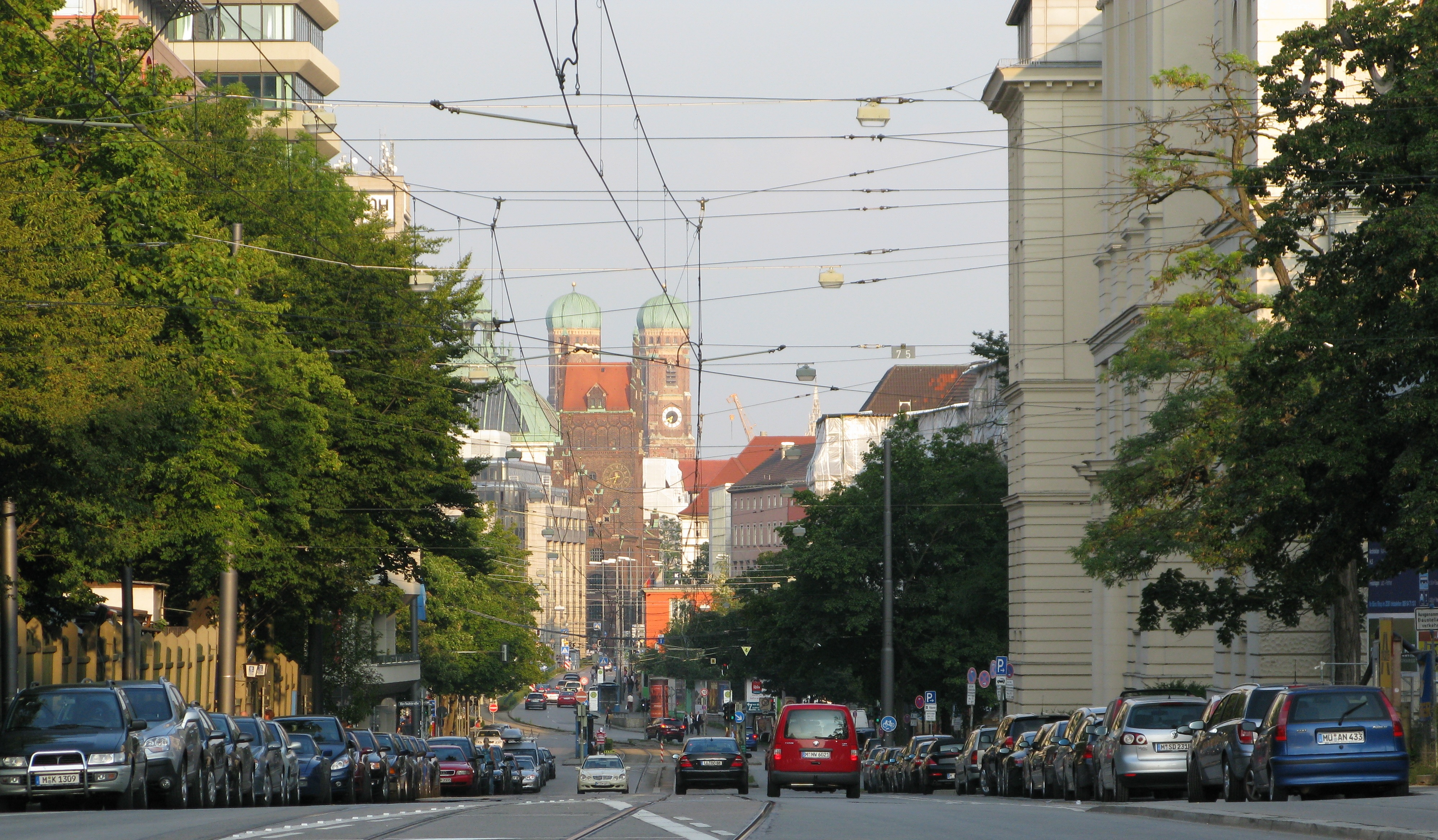
Arnulfstraße

The Arnulfstraße is a 3.8 km long urban street in Munich. It leads from the Bahnhofplatz in the Ludwigsvorstadt through the Maxvorstadt (north of the railway) west to Romanplatz in Neuhausen. Over the Hackerbrücke, there is a connection to the Landsberger Straße, which runs parallel to the south of the railway tracks. Until 1983, the tram line 3 drove through the Arnulfstraße. It was initially diverted in the course of the Munich S-Bahn construction and then shut down. In 1996, the tram service was reopened on the Arnulfstraße with the line number 17.

== Description ==
The Arnulfstraße 2 accommodates the Hotel Deutscher Kaiser, the number 3 the Kinder- und Jugendmuseum München (Children and Youth Museum Munich), the number 21 the Zentraler Omnibusbahnhof München (central bus station Munich), numbers 42/44 house the main building of the Bayerischer Rundfunk (Bavarian broadcasting) and number 52 is the Augustiner cellar. The building on Arnulfstraße 19 was the former Bundesbahn-Zentralamt (Federal Railroad Central Office) Müchnen.

The houses with the numbers 107–163 (the odd numbers) belong to the post-settlement of the Bavarian Post and Telegraph Association built in 1928–1929. The Arnulfstraße 195 is the listed railway building of the parcel post office. At Arnulfstraße 294 stood the 2017 burned Kulturpavillon on Romanplatz. In the immediate vicinity of the road lies the Arnulfpark and the Hirschgarten.

Arnulfstraße is home to sculpture X by artist Isa Genzken and lighting by Michael Friederichsen.

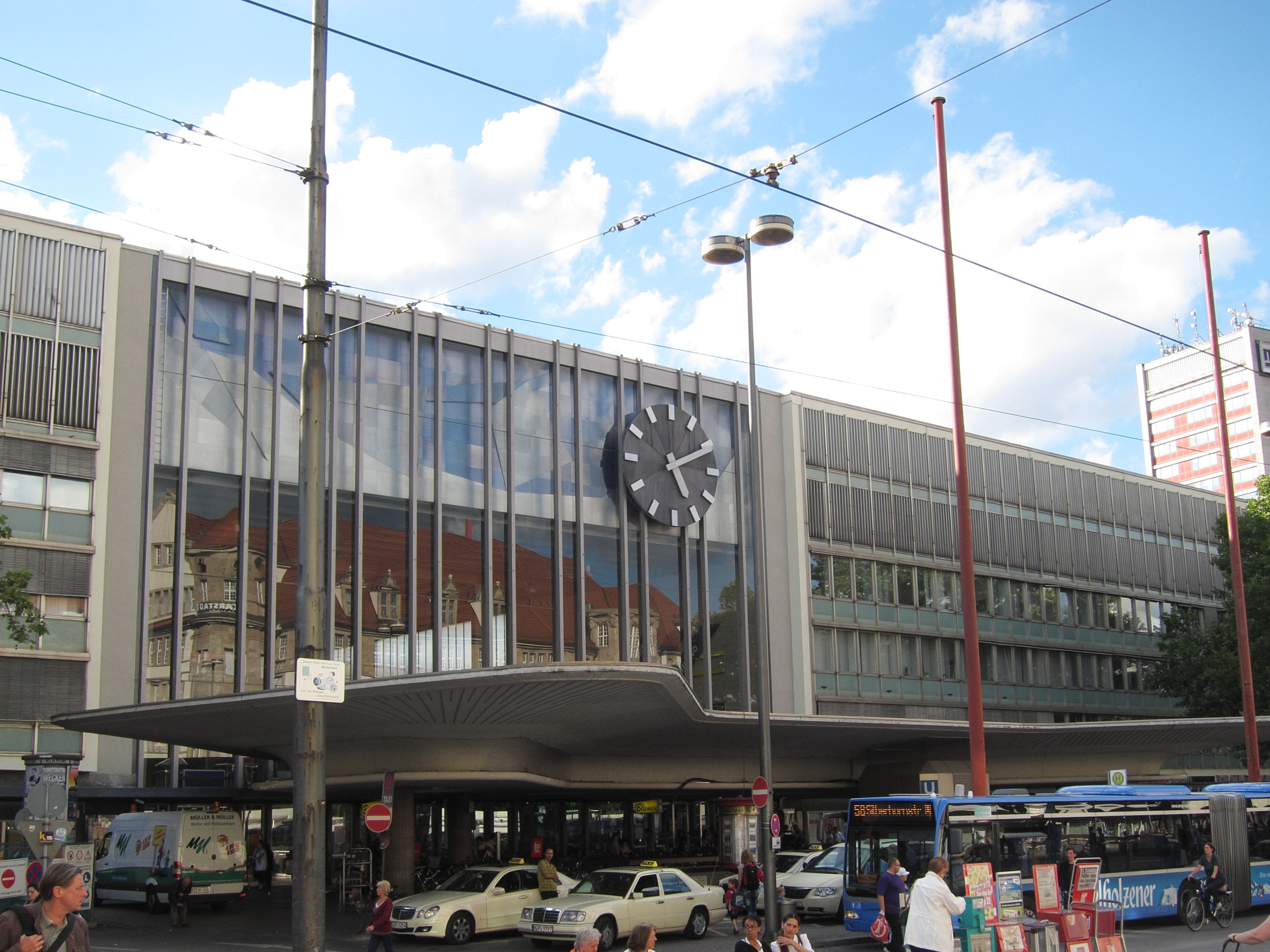
München Hauptbahnhof

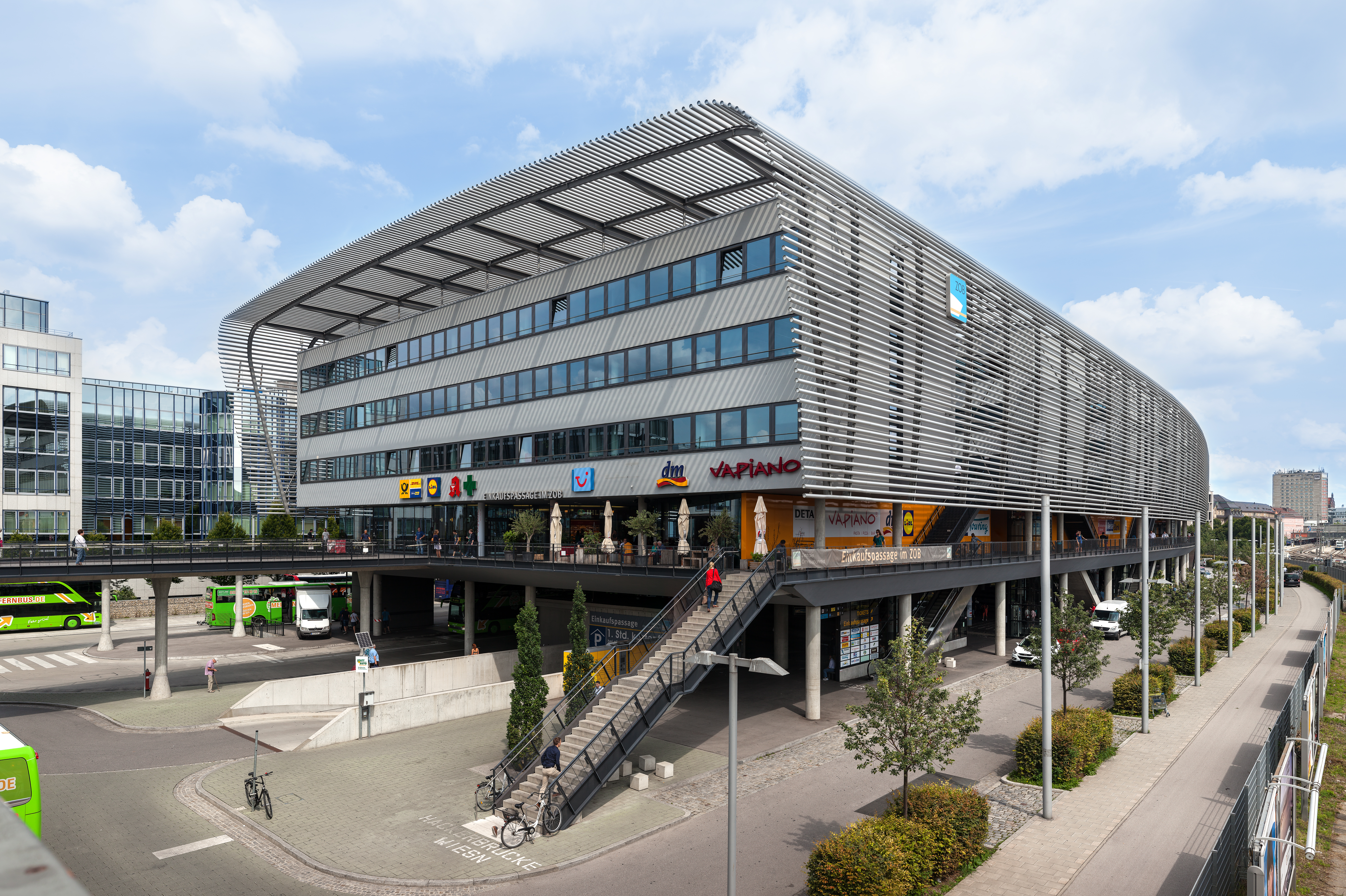
Zentraler Omnibusbahnhof München

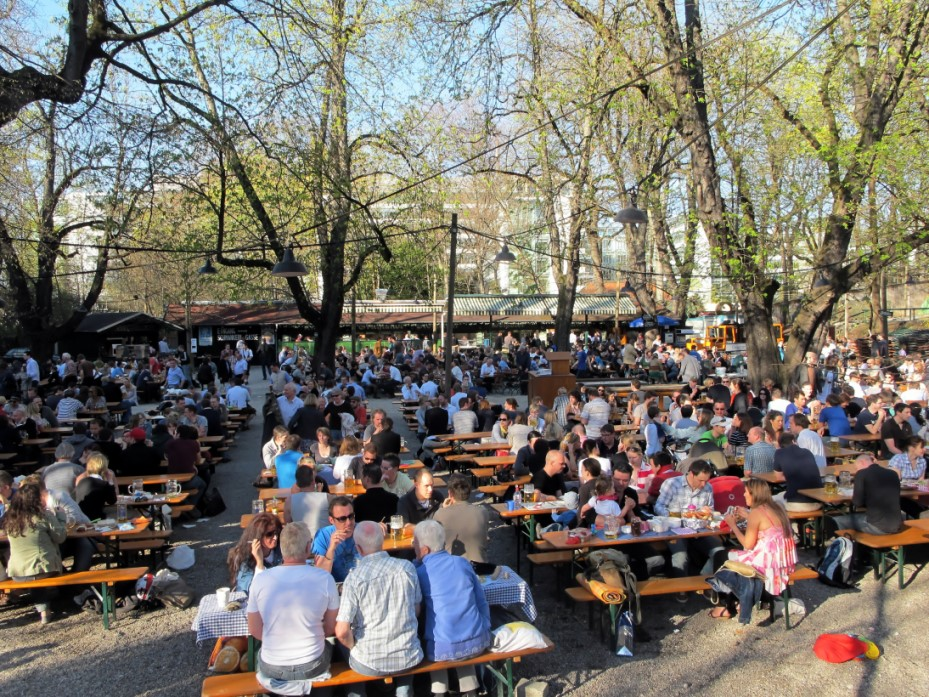
Augustiner-Keller

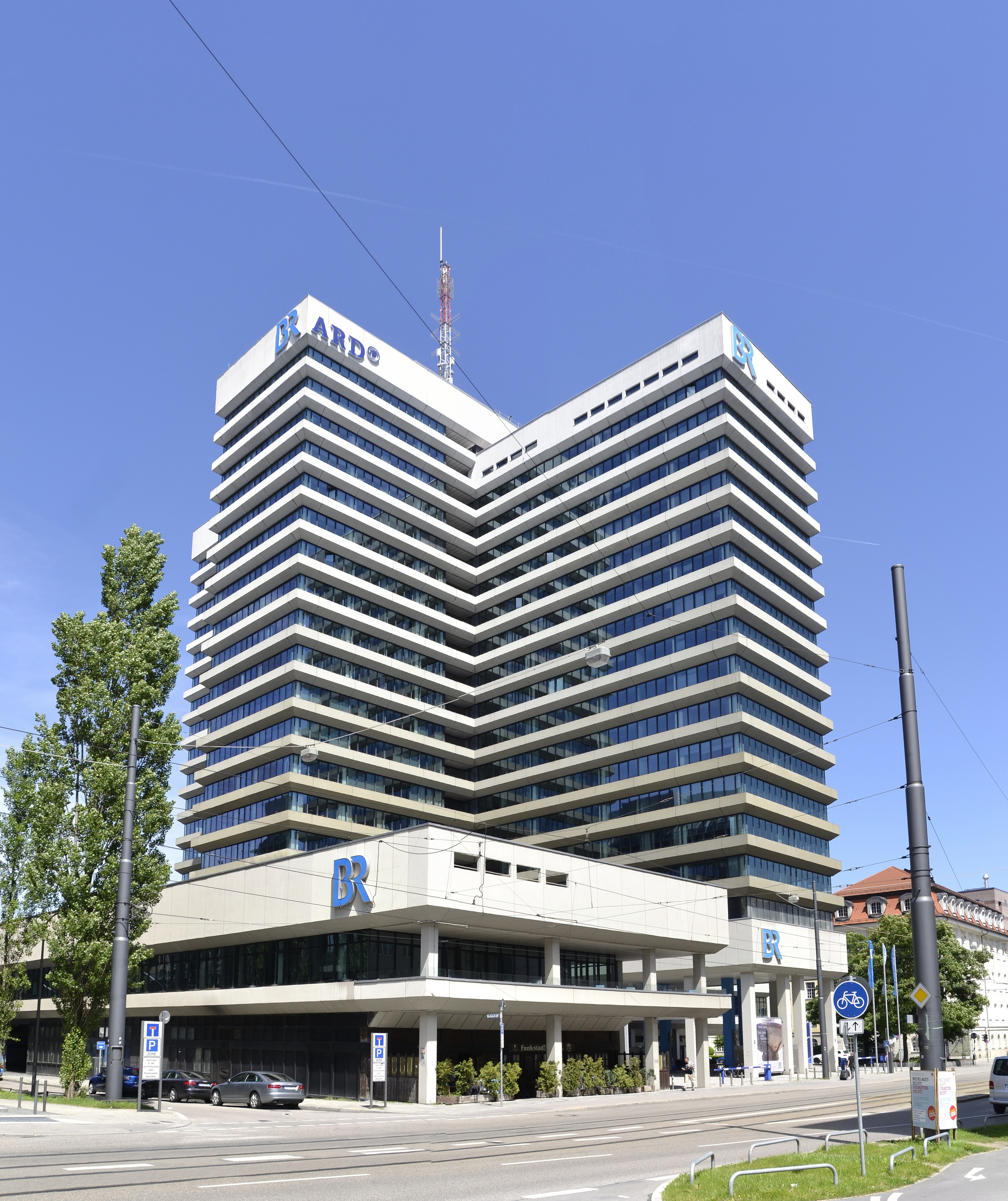
Bayerischer Rundfunk

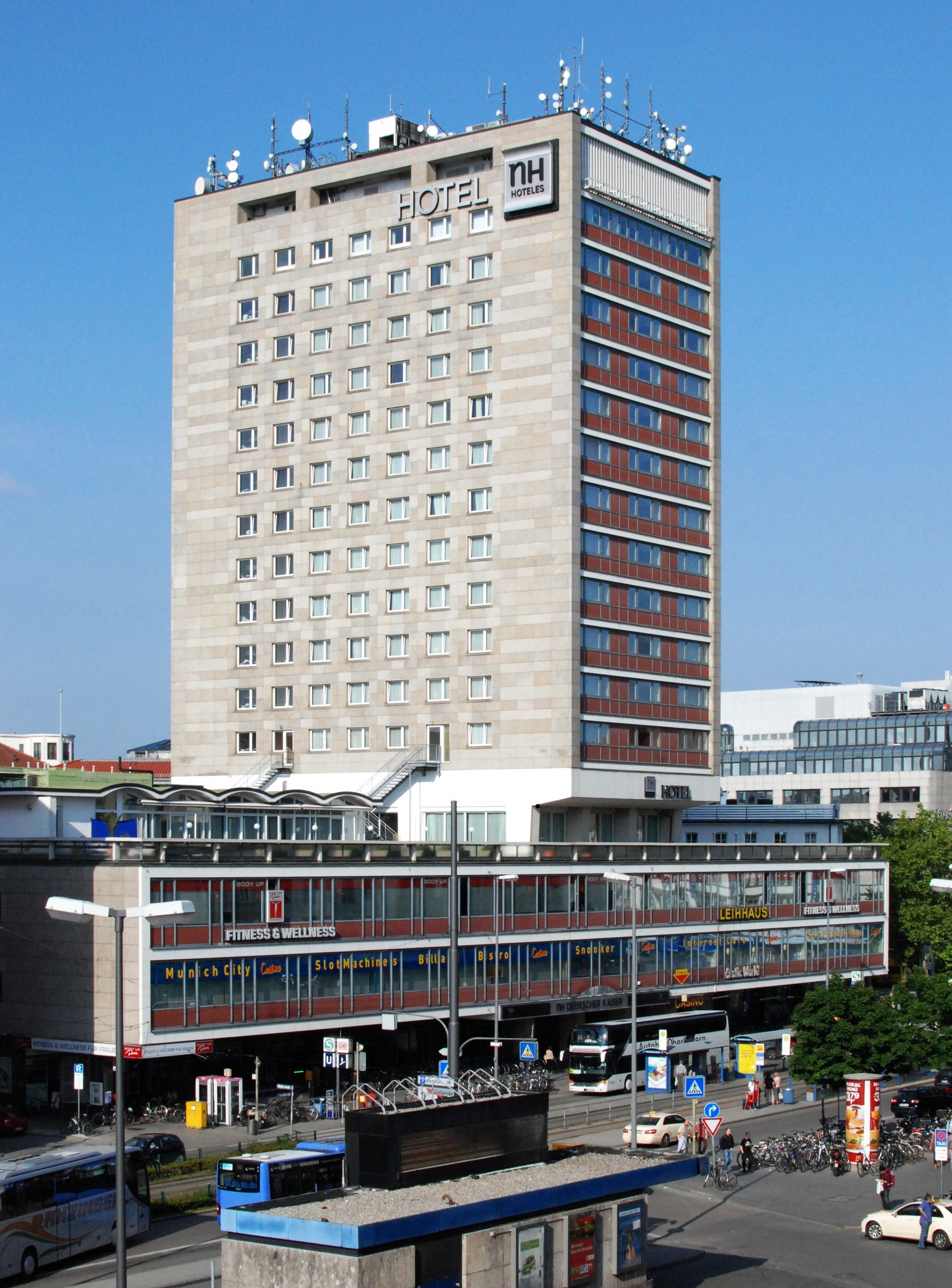
Hotel Deutscher Kaiser

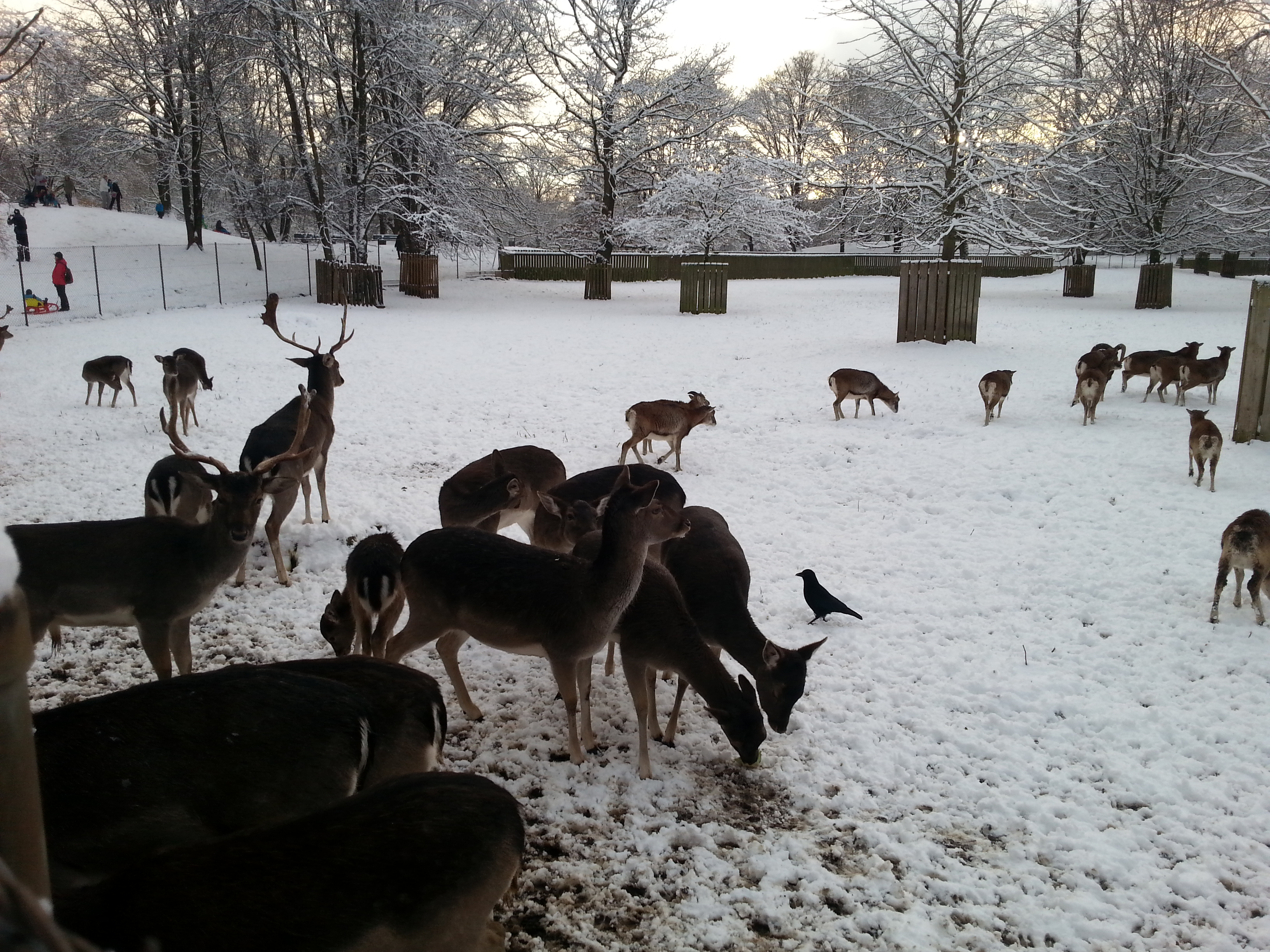
Hirschgarten

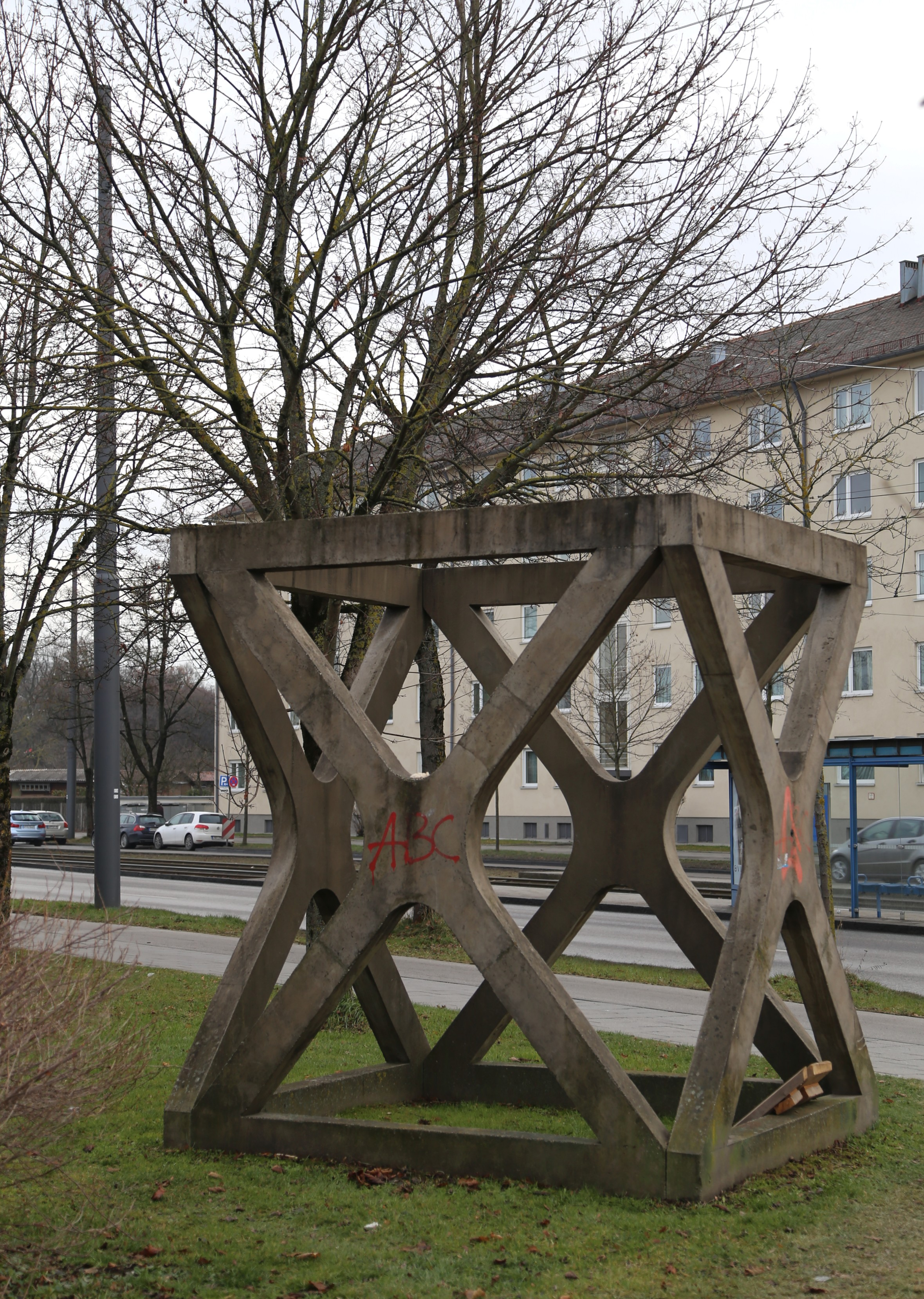
Skulptur X made by Isa Genzken at Arnulfstraße

== History ==
The former salt road was named after Arnulf of Bavaria in 1890. Previously, the Ministry of Transport and the Marsfeld barracks were located on Arnulfstraße.
