= Augustiner-Keller =

Restaurant in Germany

Coordinates: 48°08′36.7″N 11°33′5.3″E

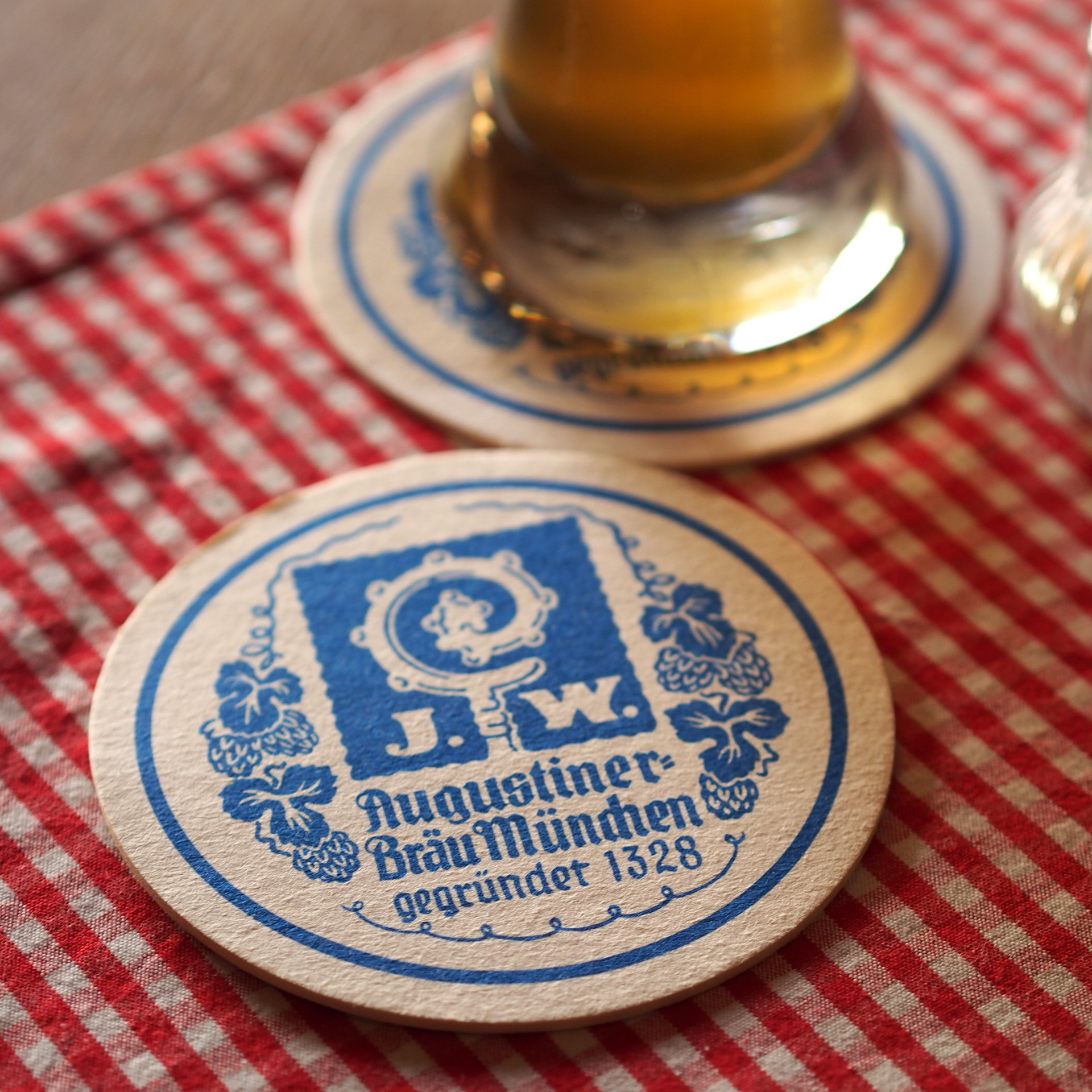
An Augustiner-Bräu beermat

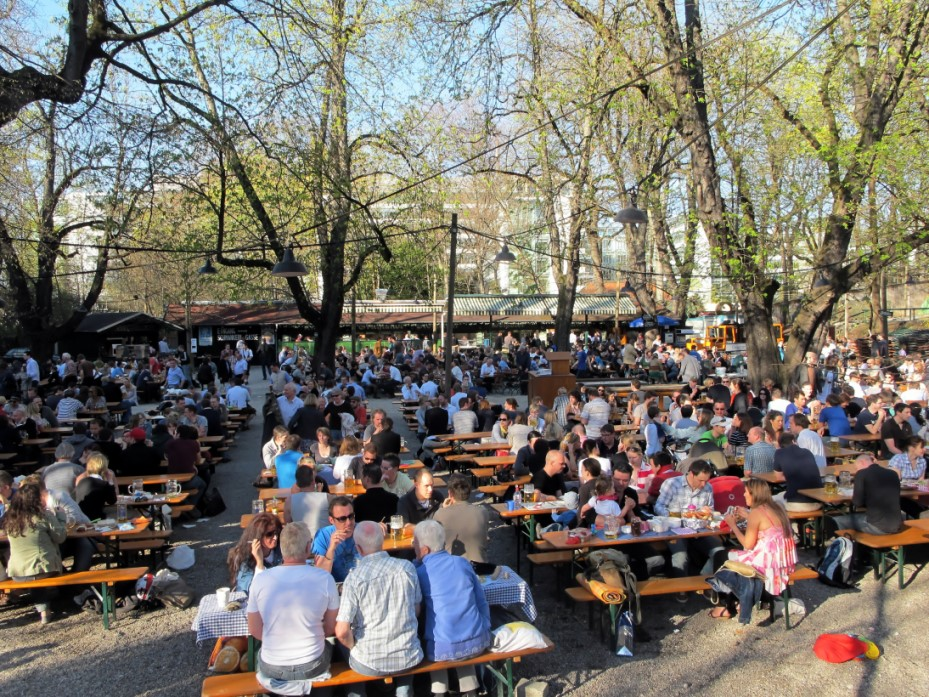
The beer garden under the horse chestnut trees

Augustiner-Keller is a traditional restaurant and beer garden in the Maxvorstadt district of Munich, Germany. The restaurant was opened in the first half of the 19th century and is one of the most popular beer gardens in Munich. Augustiner-Keller at Arnulfstraße 52 sells beer by Augustiner-Bräu, the oldest brewery in Munich.

== History ==
The restaurant was first mentioned as a beer storehouse in an 1812 city plan of Munich. This storehouse belonged to the Büchl-Brauerei brewery which no longer exists. The 1842 city plan designated a beer garden selling food and drinks at the street known as Salzstraße at the time. Although the beer garden was situated next to the old Munich execution grounds on the Marsfeld, it was seen as one of the most beautiful parts of the city. In 1842 Georg Knorr took over the restaurant, which was renamed Knorrkeller. In 1862 the brewery was acquired by the Augustiner brewer Josef Wagner; the restaurant got its current name in 1880.

== Beer garden ==
The premises were renovated in 1896: a beer garden with 5000 places, as well as a larger festival hall and the kitchen were developed. In 2010 the married couple Christian and Petra Vogler took over as the new tenants of Augustiner-Keller. There is a 208-year-old horse chestnut tree growing at the beer garden.

== Trivia ==
- In the 19th century an attraction at the beer garden was the "beer ox". The ox ran in circles and this motion was used to drive beer barrels to the upstairs floor. The beer oxen were abolished in 1891.
- One of the best known regular patrons of the restaurant in the 1960s was the local journalist Siegfried Sommer.
