= Neuraum =

Nightclub in Munich, Germany

- Interactive map of Neuraum
- Location: Hackerbrücke, Munich, Germany
- Owner: Craft Veranstaltungs AG
- Capacity: 2,400 (main floor)
- Type: Nightclub

Construction
- Opened: 4 September 2009
- Architect: hildmannwilke

Neuraum is a nightclub in Munich, Germany, located beneath the city's central coach station (ZOB) at Hackerbrücke. It opened in 2009 and is the largest club in the city by capacity.

== History ==
Neuraum opened on 4 September 2009 in a below-ground space beneath the newly built central coach station. It was established by the former operators of the Munich club Nachtgalerie, and its opening night drew several hundred visitors.

The venue is operated by Craft Veranstaltungs AG, based in Munich.

In 2024, the club attracted attention when an evangelical free church held a service in its main room.

== Layout ==
The club occupies an underground space beneath the coach station. Architectural planning and interior design were carried out by the Munich practice hildmannwilke.

The main room, the Club, covers around 1,200 square metres (13,000 sq ft) and holds up to 2,400 people; it is equipped with an LED wall, video projectors and a laser system.

A second room, the Galerie, holds up to 800 people and programmes R&B and hip hop. A third room, the 200-square-metre (2,200 sq ft) Salon, is used for hardstyle and other harder electronic styles, while the smallest room, the Keksdose (literally "biscuit tin"), plays Schlager and Neue Deutsche Welle. An outdoor terrace is used for melodic techno.

== Programming ==
Neuraum books electronic dance music acts, including DJs listed in the DJ Mag Top 100, and also hosts trance, trap and hardstyle events. The club opens on Fridays and Saturdays, and daily during the Oktoberfest, which is held nearby at the Theresienwiese.
