= Augustiner-Bräu =

Brewery in Munich, Germany

Coordinates: 48°08′35″N 11°33′07″E

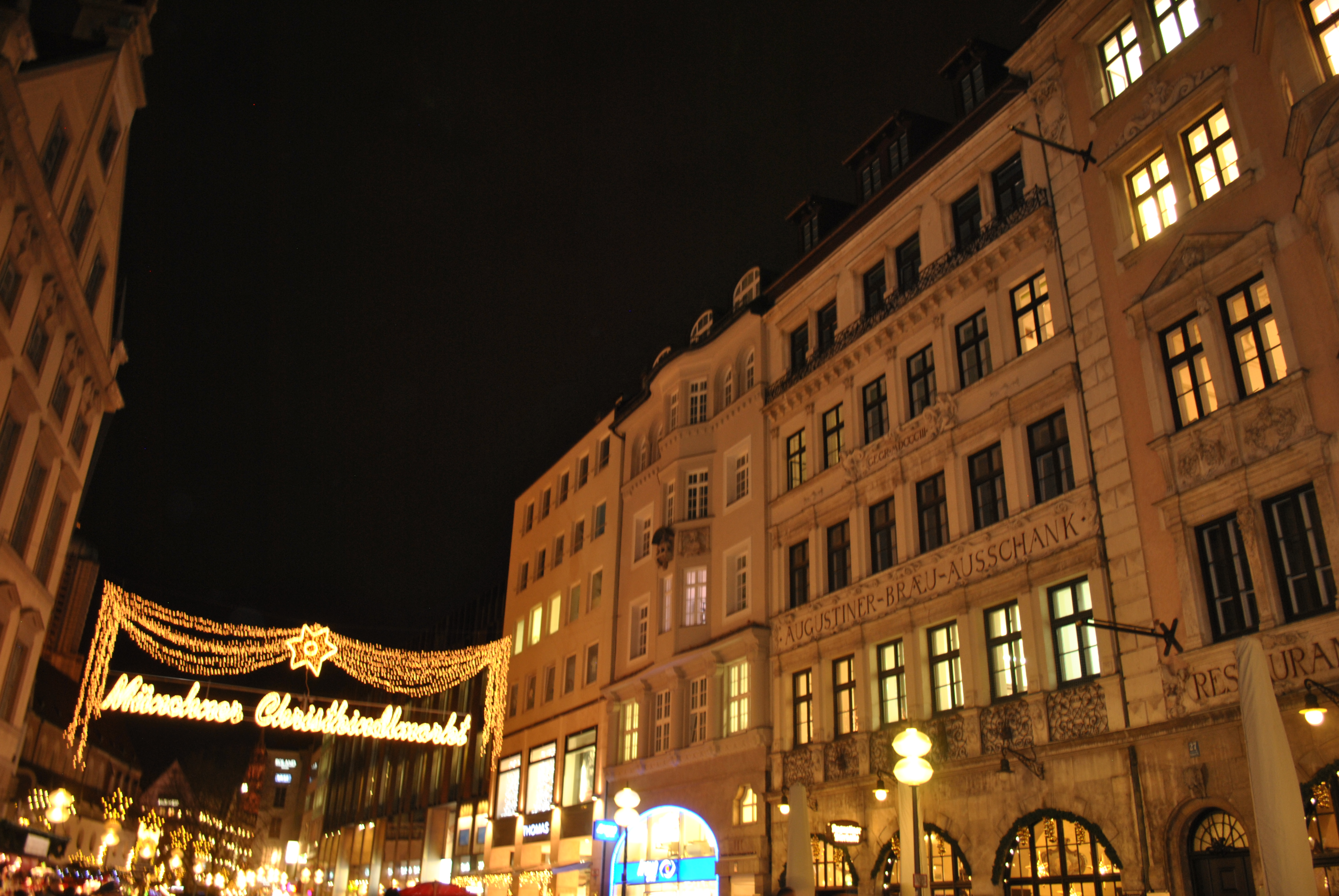
- Augustiner Stammhaus in Munich
- Location: Munich, Bavaria, Germany
- Opened: 1328
- Annual production volume: 1.63 million hectolitres (1.39 million US beer barrels) in 2018
- Owner: Augustiner-Bräu Wagner KG
- Website: augustiner-braeu.de

Active beers
| Name | Type |
| Lagerbier Hell | Helles |
| Alkoholfrei Hell | Helles (non-alcoholic) |
| Edelstoff | Export beer |
| Weißbier | Wheat beer |
| Pils | Pilsner |
| Dunkel | Dunkel |

Seasonal beers
| Name | Type |
| Oktoberfestbier | Märzen |
| Heller Bock | Maibock |
| Maximator | Doppelbock |

Augustiner-Bräu is a brewery in Munich, Germany, established in 1328. It is Munich's oldest independent brewery.

== History ==
The Augustinian Hermits arrived in Munich in 1294, called there by Bishop Emicho of Freising and Wittelsbach Duke Rudolf I. They came from Regensburg and settled on an open meadow land just outside the western city gate, on an area called the Haberfeld (or Haferfeld – "oat field"), on what would become Neuhausergasse. The monastery complex, completed around 1315, became the largest sacred building in Munich — a position it held for two centuries until the completion of the Frauenkirche cathedral in 1494.

The Augustiner Brewery was first mentioned by name in 1328, when the bakers' guild relocated their meeting place to the monastery's brew parlour following the destruction of the Heiliggeistspital in a city fire the previous year. Brewing had almost certainly been underway since shortly after the monastery's founding in 1294. The original brewing licence granted the monks the right to produce beer for their own consumption and to sell it tax-exempt — a significant commercial privilege that brought them into repeated conflict with Munich's civic brewers.

The Augustinian monks supplied beer to the Bavarian Royal Wittelsbach family for 261 years, until 1589, when Duke Wilhelm V founded his own court brewery, the Hofbräuhaus. The monastery's charitable and civic role extended beyond brewing: the Augustinians ran a guesthouse, a school, and provided pastoral care to Munich's urban poor throughout the medieval period.

During the plague years of 1348–49, the Augustinians, as an active mendicant order, tended the dying and maintained the city's charitable infrastructure at considerable cost to their own community. In the aftermath of the plague, Duke Stephen II formally recognised the monastery's expanded grounds in acknowledgement of their service.

In 1503, the monastery gained a prior of international significance: Johann von Staupitz, Vicar-General of the reformed German Augustinian congregation, who would go on to become the principal spiritual mentor of Martin Luther. Staupitz administered the Munich house from 1500 to 1503, during which time he laid the theological groundwork for what would become the Reformation. Luther himself is believed to have visited the Munich monastery on his travels as an Augustinian friar.

In 1759, the Augustinian Monks of Munich were among the pioneers of the Bavarian Academy of Sciences and Humanities. During this era, Augustiner's annual output reached 250,000 litres (2,100 US bbl), three times the amount of an average brewery of the time. However, the monastery's commercial success also brought censure: in 1784, Munich's civic brewers formally complained to the city council about the monks' tax-exempt competition, and in 1791, Elector Karl Theodor publicly reprimanded the Augustinians for allowing the brewery tavern to operate as a secular drinking house.

In 1803, as part of the secularisation carried out under Napoleonic influence, the monastery was dissolved after 509 years of continuous occupation. The brewery was run by the state before passing into private ownership. The monastery church was deconsecrated and repurposed as a toll hall; the convent buildings became the offices of the Munich police headquarters, which they remain today. In 1817, as the original brewery buildings had fallen into disrepair, the operation was moved to Neuhauser Straße.

In March 1829, Anton and Therese Wagner, a brewing family from Attaching near Freising, acquired the brewery and the dormant Augustinian brewing licence. The brewery has remained in private or foundation ownership since. Therese Wagner continued to run the business after Anton's death in 1844, and around 1840 had acquired a storage cellar on Rosenheimer Straße to expand capacity.

Their son, Joseph Wagner, took on management after his mother's death. In 1862, the brewery expanded with the addition of a storage cellar at Arnulfstraße 52, the current site of the Augustiner-Keller and Beer Garden. Between 1883 and 1890, Joseph Wagner oversaw the construction of a new industrial brewery at Landsberger Straße 31–35, to which all production was gradually moved; the Neuhauser Straße location was converted into the restaurant now known as the Augustiner Stammhaus. In 1880, Joseph Wagner was a founding member of the Bavarian Beer Alliance, and in 1887 Augustiner's iconic "JW" trademark with the bishop's staff was registered — the ecclesiastical symbol combined with the brewer's initials, a continuity with the brewery's monastic origins that remains on every bottle.

As a result of aerial bombing during the Second World War, the Augustiner Brewery was 60% destroyed. In 1971, the brewhouse was completely renovated with the adoption of stainless steel tanks.

In 1996, Edith Haberland Wagner, the last of the Wagner dynasty, bequeathed her majority shareholding not to an individual heir but to the Edith Haberland Wagner Foundation, a charitable trust which continues to hold 51% of the brewery's shares. This arrangement ensures Augustiner remains independent of international corporate ownership — the only one of Munich's six major breweries to do so.

In 2013, Augustiner opened the Klosterwirt restaurant on Augustinerstrasse, immediately adjacent to the former monastery precinct — the closest the brewery has returned to its founding ground since the monks were expelled in 1803. The street itself follows the line of the first city wall moat; the former monastery church, now housing the German Hunting and Fishing Museum, stands on the opposite side of the street.

== Augustiner at Oktoberfest ==
It is not known when Augustiner beer was first featured at the Oktoberfest, but the first record of an Augustiner beer stall is featured on a picture dating from 1867. The first appearance of an Augustiner beer "castle" was later in 1903, and finally in 1926, the Augustiner Festhalle was erected for the first time. The original tent featured a tower, which was later removed from the construction design during the years 1949-2010. The tower was reinstated in 2010 in celebration of the 200th anniversary of the Oktoberfest, and has continued to be a feature of the Festhalle to this day. Since 1987, Augustiner is the only brewery, of the 6 featured at Oktoberfest, to exclusively pour from their wooden barrels.

== Distribution and marketing ==
Augustiner beer is normally found within the Greater Munich area, but in the last few years it has become popular outside Munich, for example in Berlin, where it is one of the most successful beers in Mitte, even though the company does not advertise. When most German breweries updated their bottles to a slim and more modern design to give their beer a more classy and less old fashioned appearance, Augustiner stuck with its original "classic" form, often nicknamed the "Bauarbeiterhalbe" (construction worker's half litre). The labels have also not changed in over 20 years. The success of the brand has been attributed to the traditional "retro" image it enjoys as one of the last major breweries in Munich that is not owned by an international beer conglomerate; Augustiner-Bräu is 51%-owned by a charitable foundation.

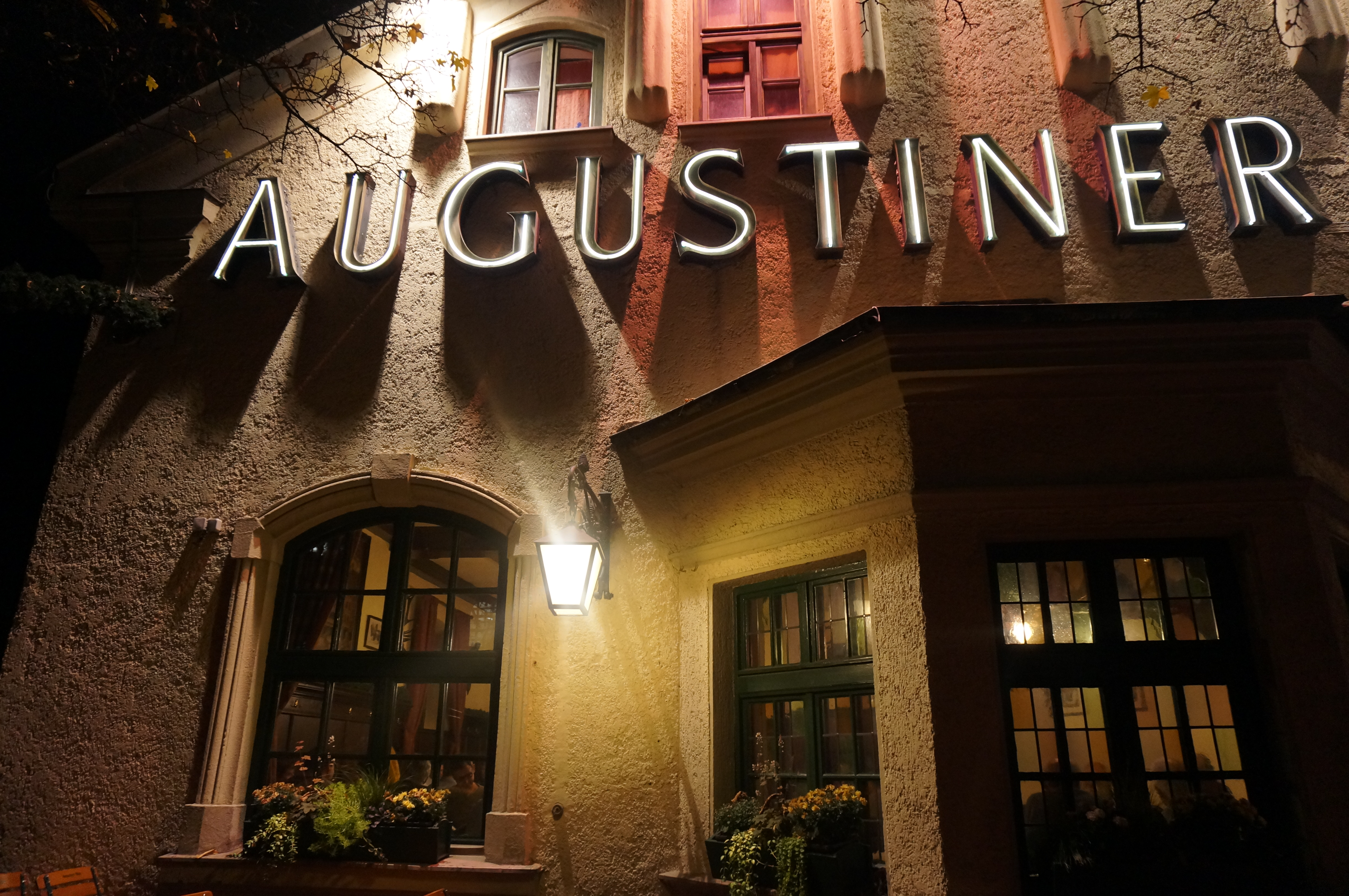
Augustiner-Bräu keller in Munich

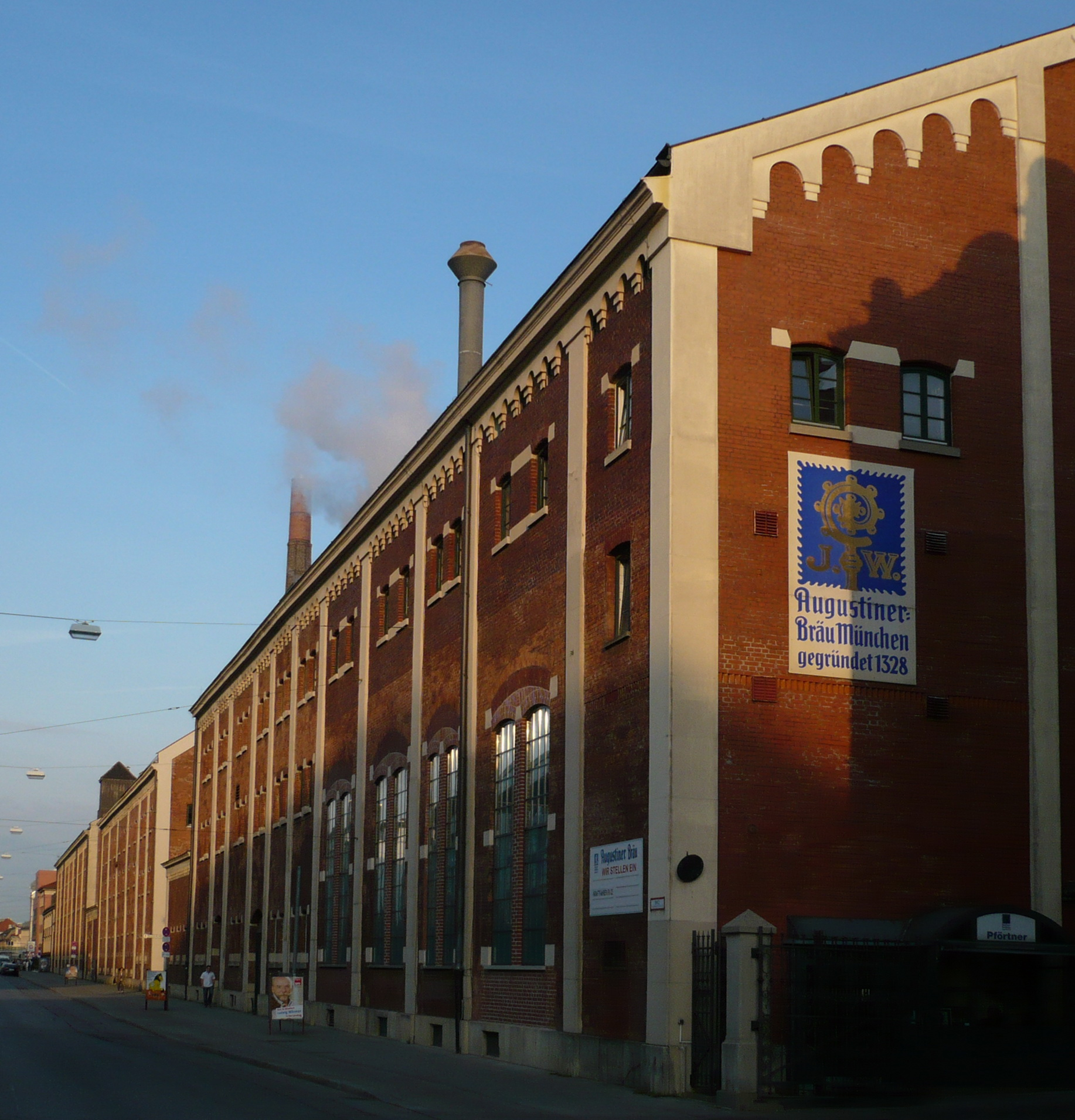
Augustiner brewery

Augustiner-Bräu operates a beer tent at the Oktoberfest, as well as owning one of Munich's largest beer gardens, the Augustiner-Keller at Arnulfstraße 52, and several traditional bars throughout the city.

It is imported into United States by Global Village Imports, LLC. of King of Prussia, PA. Since distribution is very limited, only Augustiner Edelstoff, Maximator, and Lagerbier Hell are available.

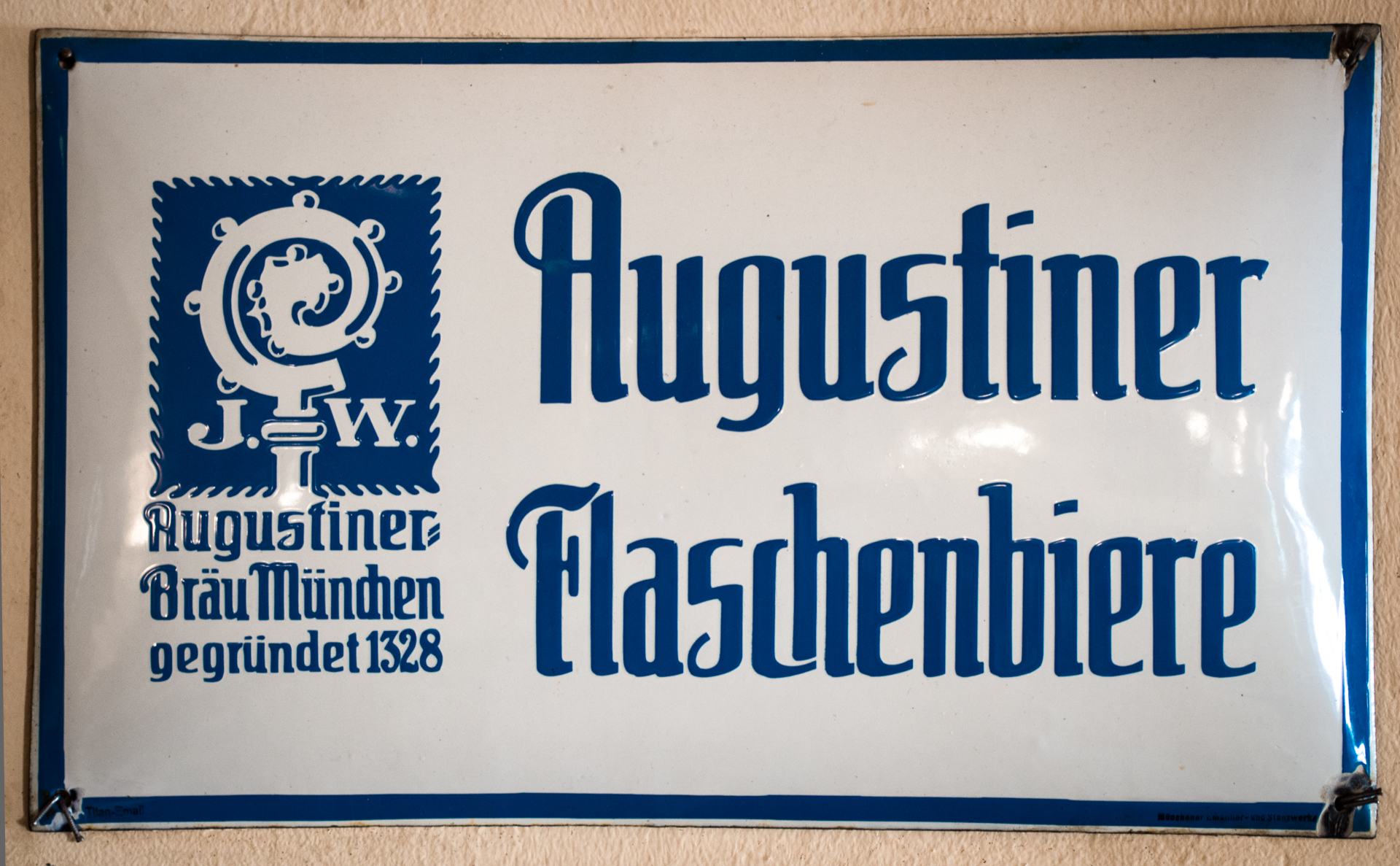
Enamel beer advertising sign in a pub in Munich

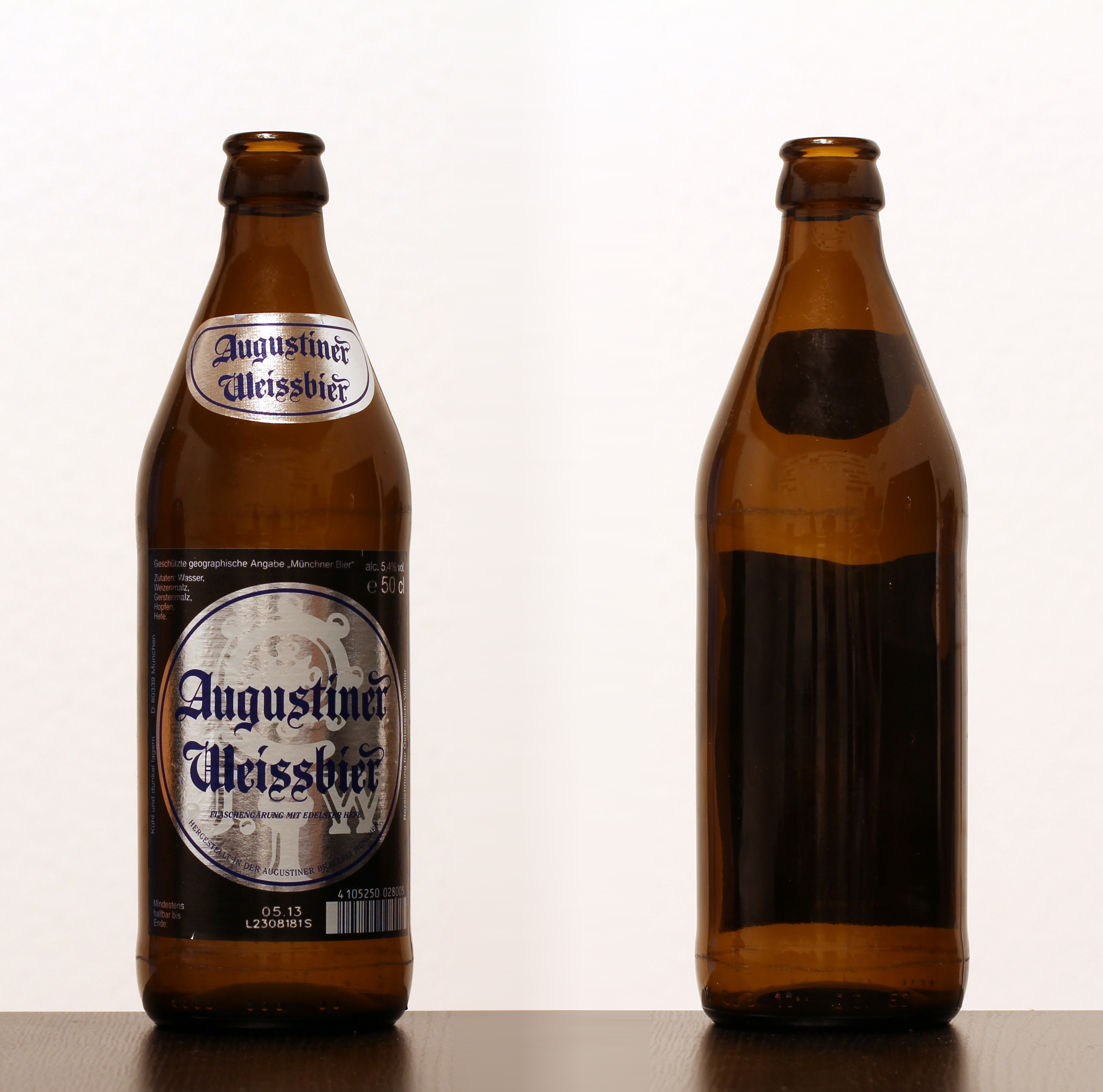
Augustiner Weissbier

== Beers ==
- Augustiner Lagerbier Hell (5.2%), a pale lager.
- Augustiner Alkoholfrei Hell, a non-alcoholic pale lager.
- Edelstoff (5.6%), a slightly brighter, sweeter, more sparkly and stronger lager.
- Augustiner Dunkel, a malty dark lager.
- Augustiner Pils, a Pilsner lager.
- Augustiner Weißbier.
- Augustiner Oktoberfestbier (6.3%), a Märzen, brewed for Oktoberfest. Augustiner′s Oktoberfest beer and Edelstoff are the only beers at the festival that are still served from wooden barrels.
- Augustiner Maximator, a Doppelbock. Brewed to coincide with Lent, this is a strong dark lager (7.5%).
- Augustiner Heller Bock, a strong pale lager (7.2%), available in May and June.

All of Augustiner′s brands are brewed in accordance with the Reinheitsgebot. This means the ingredients of the beer are just four: water, grain (barley and or wheat), hops and yeast.

== See also ==
- Oktoberfest
