= Munich Hackerbrücke station =

Munich S-Bahn station

München Hackerbrücke
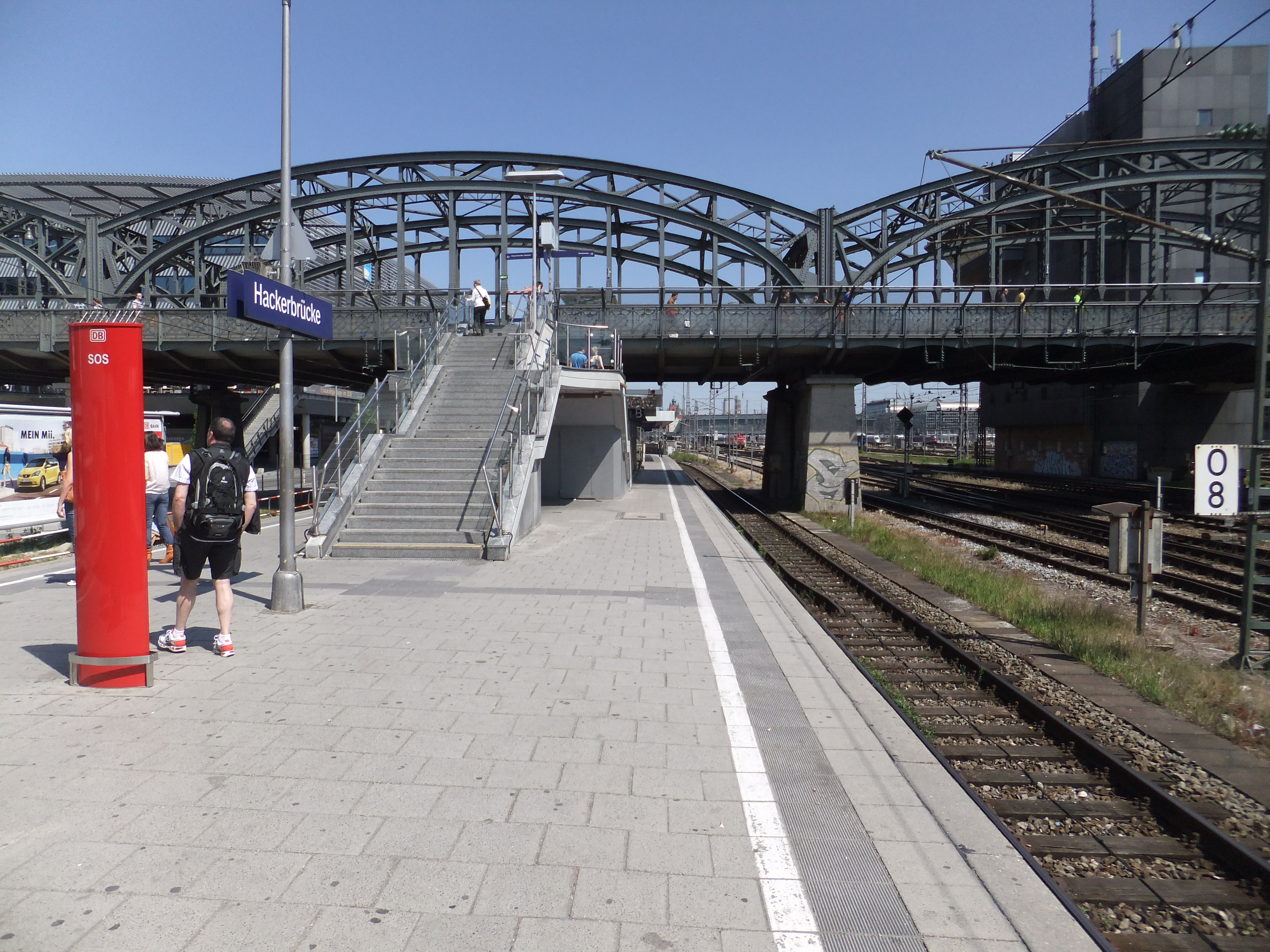
- Platforms

General information
- Location: Munich, Bavaria; Germany
- Coordinates: 48°8′31″N 11°32′55″E
- Owner: Deutsche Bahn
- Operator: DB Station&Service
- Lines: S-Bahn trunk line (KBS 999)
- Platforms: 1 island platform
- Tracks: 2
- Train operators: S-Bahn München
- Connections: Long distance buses (ZOB)

Construction
- Parking: yes
- Cycle facilities: yes
- Accessible: yes

Other information
- Station code: 4232
- DS100 code: MHAB
- Category: 3
- Fare zone: : M
- Website: stationsdatenbank.de; www.bahnhof.de

History
- Opened: 1972

Passengers
- 23,500 daily

Services
Preceding station	Munich S-Bahn	Following station
Donnersbergerbrücke towards Freising or Flughafen	S1	München Hbf towards Leuchtenbergring
Donnersbergerbrücke towards Petershausen or Altomünster	S2	München Hbf towards Erding
Donnersbergerbrücke towards Mammendorf	S3	München Hbf towards Holzkirchen
Donnersbergerbrücke towards Geltendorf	S4	München Hbf towards Ebersberg
Donnersbergerbrücke towards Weßling	S5	München Hbf towards Kreuzstraße
Donnersbergerbrücke towards Tutzing	S6	München Hbf towards Ebersberg
Donnersbergerbrücke towards Wolfratshausen	S7	München Hbf towards München Hbf
Donnersbergerbrücke towards Herrsching	S8	München Hbf towards Flughafen
Location

Munich Hackerbrücke station is a station opened in 1972 on the Munich S-Bahn network below Hackerbrücke (Hacker bridge) that is close to Munich Central Station (German: Hauptbahnhof). It is classified by Deutsche Bahn as a category 3 station and has a 211 metre long central platform between two platform tracks and is located directly in front of a 3.2 percent drop into the S-Bahn trunk line tunnel. Immediately to the south is the Munich Hauptbahnhof signal box, which monitors and controls all the track work at the Central Station and on the adjoining lines (excluding the S-Bahn).

Particularly during the periods of the Oktoberfest, this station is important because it is only about 650 metres from the main venue at Theresienwiese. Munich Hackerbrücke is served by the S-Bahn lines 1 to 8. Only the S-Bahn lines S 20, S 27 and A do not operate here. In addition to the S-Bahn station, the tram stop of the same name is located on the adjacent street called Arnulfstraße and is served by tram lines, and. The Munich central bus station opened north of the station on 11 September 2009.

== Notable places nearby ==
- Circus Krone
- Hackerbrücke
- Zentraler Omnibusbahnhof München
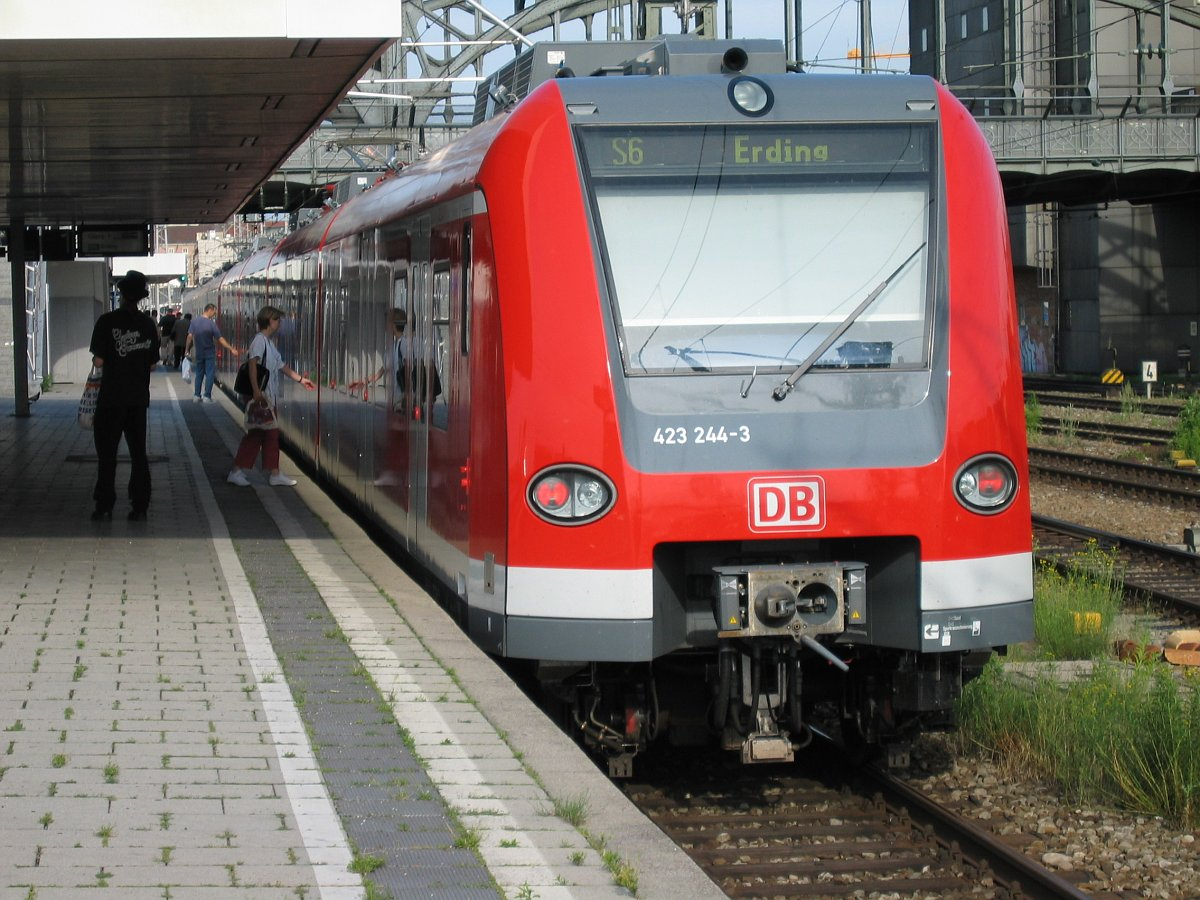
S-Bahn train at Hackerbrücke station
