= Zentraler Omnibusbahnhof München =

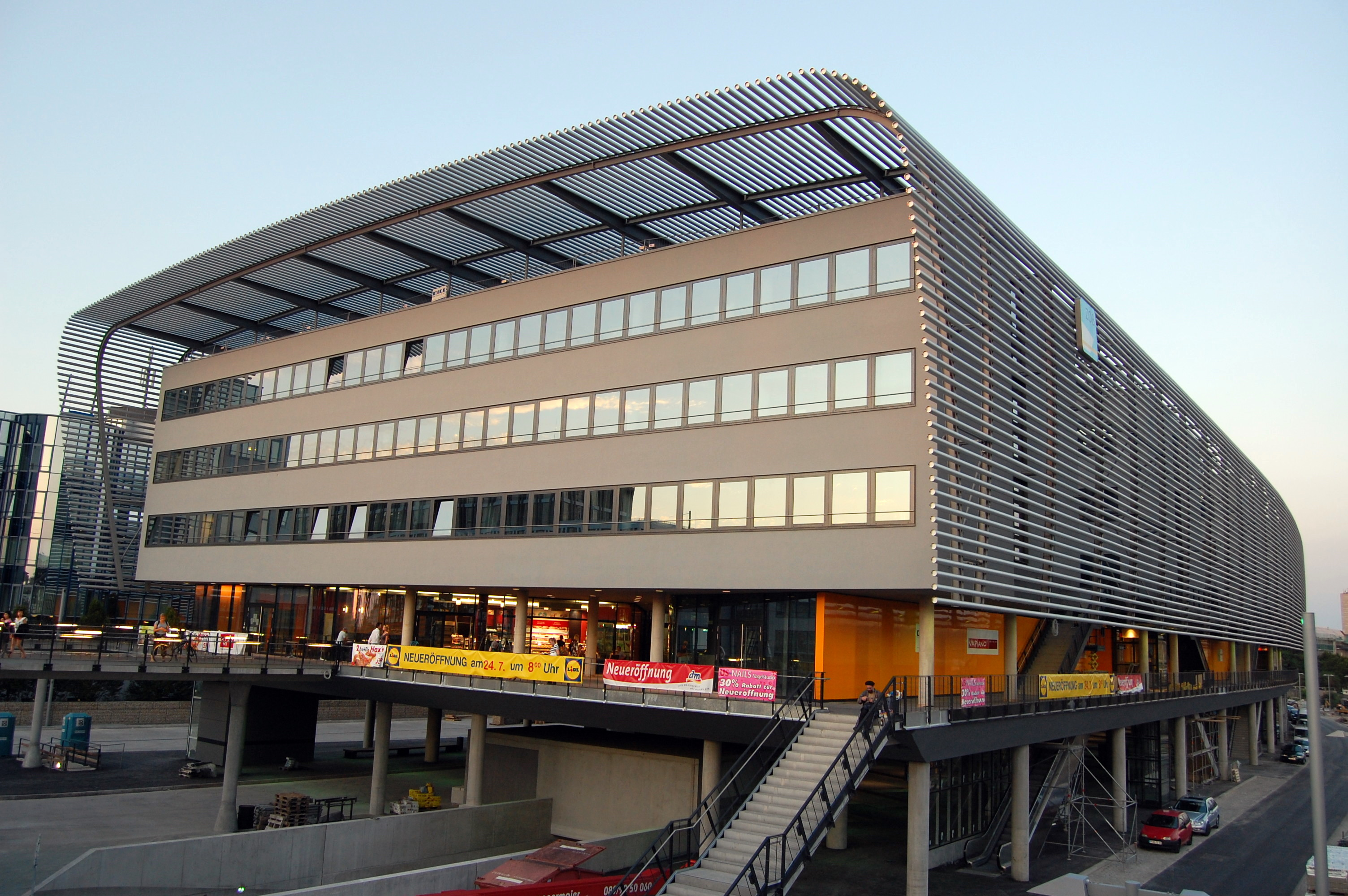

General information
- Location: Maxvorstadt, Munich, Bavaria; Germany
- Coordinates: 48°08′33″N 11°33′00″E
- System: bus service
- Operator: Bayerisches Rotes Kreuz (BRK)

Other information
- Website: www.muenchen-zob.de

History
- Opened: 11 September 2009; 16 years ago
Location

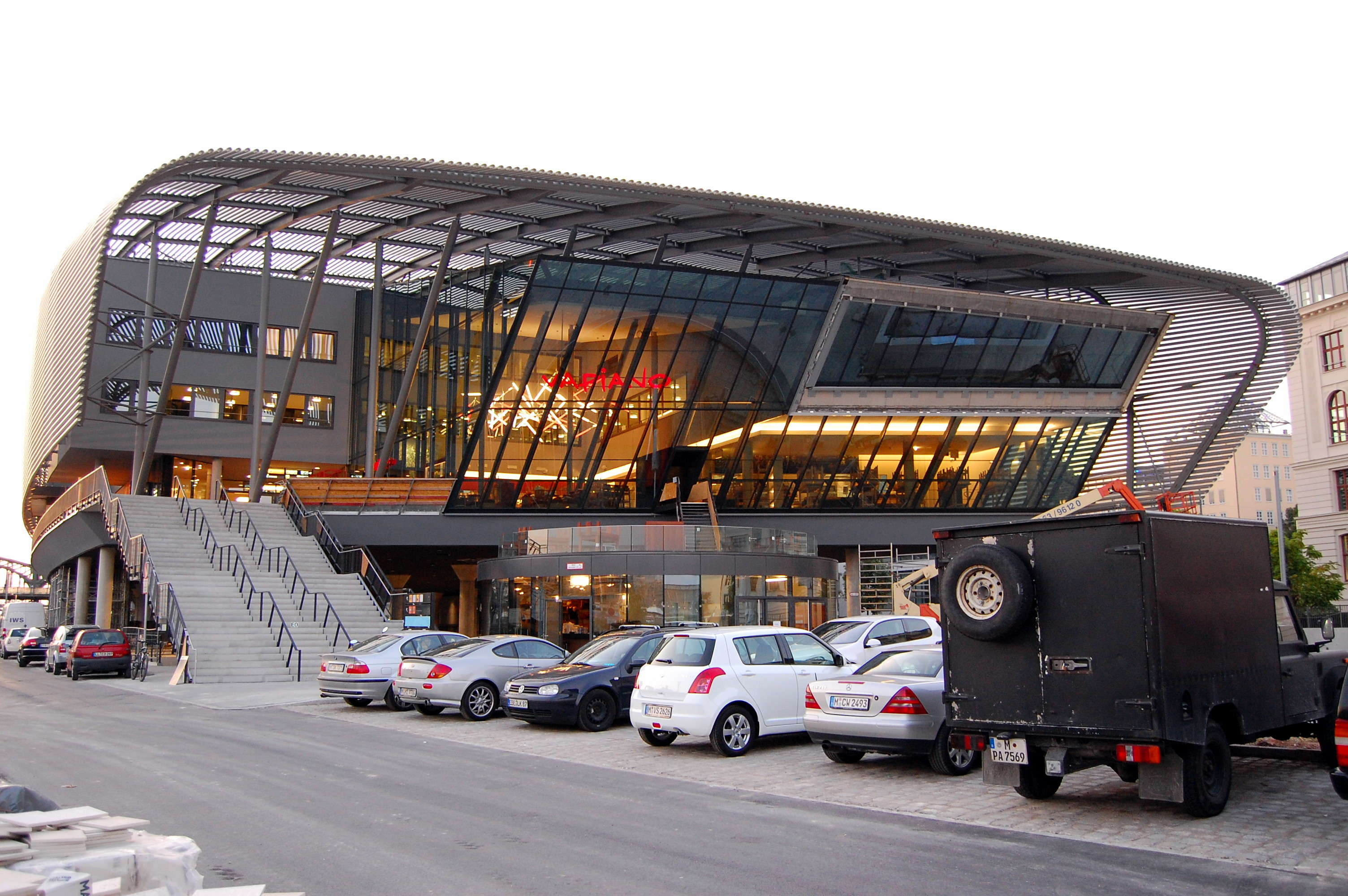

Zentraler Omnibusbahnhof München (ZOB München, Central bus station Munich) is a central bus station located in Maxvorstadt, Munich, Bavaria, Germany. The terminal has an area of 17,221 square metres (185,370 sq ft). The bus station was established on 11 September 2009 and is a major transportation hub for bus and train with national and international traffic. The bus station also has spacious offices and retail space for retailers that give it an airport-like character. The nearest S-Bahn station is Munich Hackerbrücke station.

== Location and description ==
The central bus station was opened on 11 September 2009 and is located in the immediate vicinity of the Hackerbrücke S-Bahn station and not far from Munich Central Station. The Hackerbrücke, which is located directly next door, is connected to the bus station building via two bridges. Arnulfpark, a modern city quarter with residential and office buildings, cultural facilities and restaurants, is located in the immediate vicinity.

The ZOB was designed as a multifunctional property with a floor area of around 25,000 m^{2}, seven storeys and various levels of use. The bus station, which is located below the ground floor, is accessible via Arnulfstraße and has 29 stops where national and international long-distance scheduled bus services as well as most of Munich's tourist bus services are operated. Escalators or elevators take passengers to the first floor, where the shopping arcade with retail and catering areas is located, giving the ZOB an airport-like character. Tenants of the upper floor include Lidl, dm-drogerie markt, McDonald's, TUI and Vapiano. On three further upper floors and an area of about 10,300 m^{2} there are offices, a parking deck and a discotheque in the basement.

== Architecture ==
After a public tender by the city of Munich in 2002, the contract for the design was awarded to the architectural firm Auer+Weber+Assoziierte. The futuristic exterior façade is based on the shape of an ICE powerhead, which was to fit in with the redesign of Munich's main railway station discussed at the time. Almost 31 km of tubes were used for the aluminium tube design, which is unique in Germany.

== Operation of the bus station ==
=== Owner ===
In 2014, the ZOB was acquired by the Munich issuing house WealthCap, previously owned by the project developer Hochtief. The bus station is operated by the Bavarian Red Cross.

=== User ===
The bus station is mainly used by numerous long-distance bus operators, but also by tour operators. For example, buses operated by companies such as Flixbus or IC Bus, which offer national and international connections, regularly stop at the ZOB. Public buses are excluded, as the public transport connection is via Munich S-Bahn and Munich tramway.

=== Fees ===
Buses stopping at the ZOB pay 6.00 euros for half an hour and 11.00 euros for a full hour's stay at the opening. In 2018 the prices were 8.00 and 11.00 euros respectively. In addition, there are other price scales of up to 56.00 euros for the maximum permitted parking duration of 24 hours.

== Criticism ==
The premises located above the bus stops were criticised for several years due to their initial lack of attractiveness for tenants. For the opening of the bus station, only six of the 17 rental spaces could be let. Due to the low customer frequency of only 1,500 persons per day compared to the planned 8,000 to 10,000, several tenants cut their payments to the project developer Hochtief in 2011, whereupon Hochtief filed a lawsuit. The Landgericht München I ruled in favour of a tenant in a first case in 2013.

The deregulation of the long-distance bus market in Germany led to a significant improvement in the use of the ZOB from the beginning of 2013. Average arrivals and departures increased from 80 buses per day in 2010 to 135 per day in 2013. 42,000 buses per year, i.e. an average of 115 buses per day, were expected at the opening of the bus station.
