= Hirschgarten =

Park in Munich, Germany

Coordinates: 48.1486°N 11.5125°E

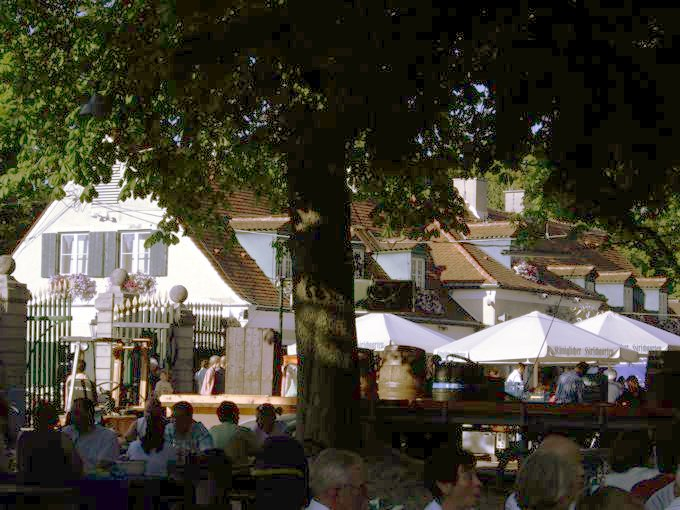
The Hirschgarten in 2006

The Hirschgarten, formally the Königlicher Hirschgarten, is a 40-hectare (99-acre) public park in the Nymphenburg district of Munich, Germany. It contains a restaurant and beer garden, the latter with seating for about 8,000 people.

Laid out in 1780 for Bavarian Elector Charles Theodore as a hunting ground, the park was later opened to the public. The Jägerhaus (hunter's house), which now houses the park's restaurant, was built in 1791.

A two-hectare enclosure in the park holds fallow deer and mouflon.
