= Bundesbahn Central Offices =

Defunct West German department

Coordinates: 52°17′39″N 8°56′27″E

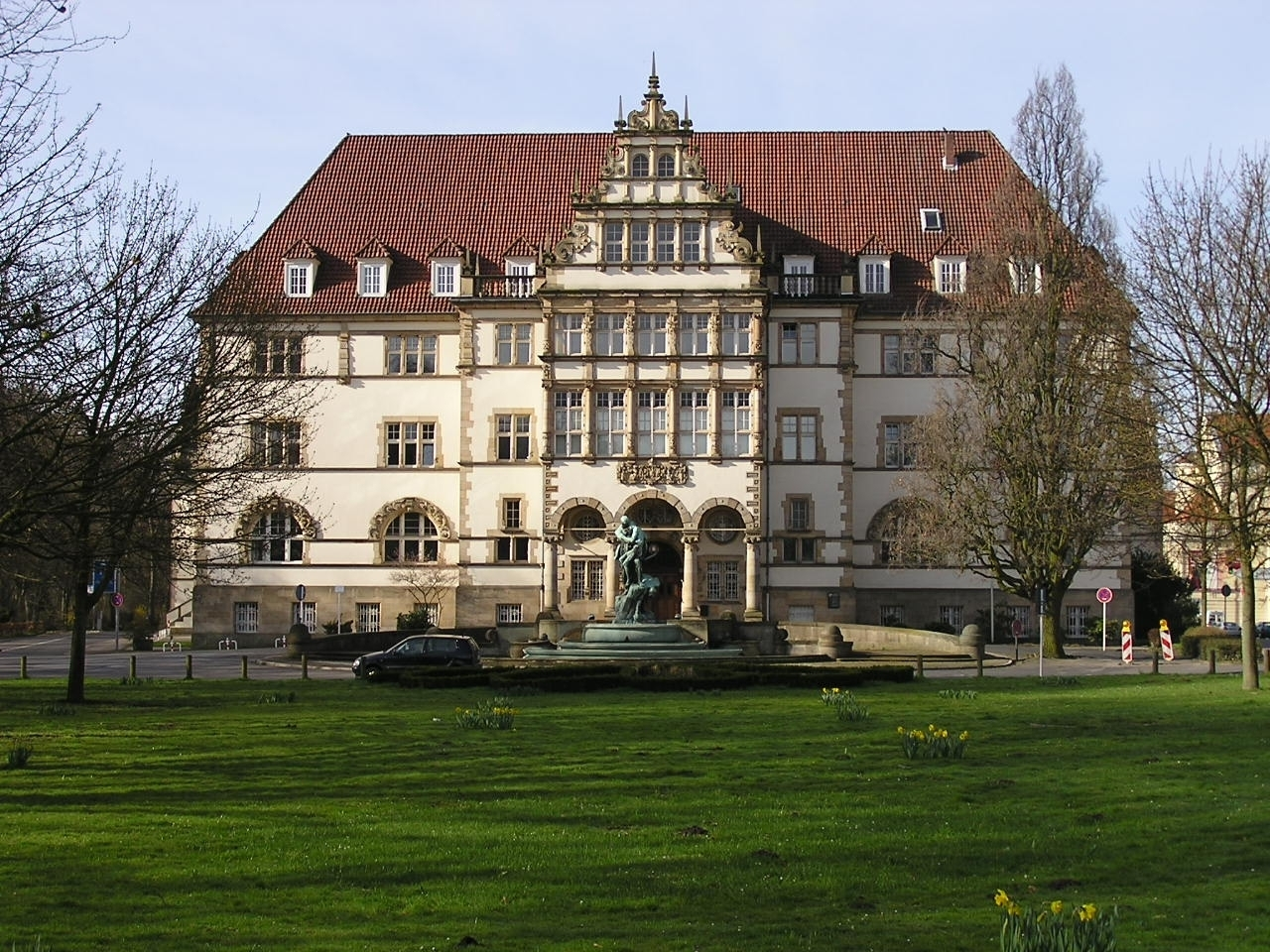
Former headquarters of the BZA in Minden

The Bundesbahn Central Offices (German: Bundesbahn-Zentralämter) or BZA in Minden and Munich was the department of the Deutsche Bundesbahn responsible for technological development and procurement of rail vehicles and infrastructure. Additionally, accounting and statistical services, as well as technical standards for the West German state railway system, were provided by the BZA.

After the formation of the Deutsche Bahn AG DB Systemtechnik inherited responsibility for technological development and procurement.

== History ==
After 1945, the functions of the former Reichsbahn Central Offices (Reichsbahn-Zentralämter, RZA) in Berlin were transferred first to Göttingen, then from 1950 to Minden and in parallel also at Munich.

From 1 January 1994 the BZA was incorporated into the new corporate structure of the Deutsche Bahn. Minden was the centre for the Research and Technology activities.

Later, further research activities of the Deutsche Bahn AG took place in Munich at the site of the former repair shop at München-Freimann at the Völckerstraße location.

A major task of the BZA was the development of rail vehicles, often in collaboration with the heavy engineering firms that would produce the final product. Since the transformation of the two former state railway companies of East and West Germany the Deutsche Bahn AG, and the subsequent re-organisation the DBAG no longer is so involved in the design of rail vehicles - instead butting them from the international corporations that have developed at around the same time. Some of the duties of the BZA have been inherited by DB Systemtechnik.

== See also ==
- Reichsbahn-CBS (de:Reichsbahn-CBS German) : The equivalent technology centre for the Deutsche Reichsbahn
- British Rail Engineering Limited and British Rail Research Division : Contemporary British organisations, no longer extant since privatisation.

== Trivia ==
By 1982 the BZA at Minden had procured, amongst other things: 35.5 million tonnes of gravel, 170,000 tons of rails, 300,000 wood and 900,000 concrete sleepers, 30,000 pallets, and 10,000 tonnes of writing and printing paper.
