= Beer garden =

Outdoor area in which beer, other drinks, and local food are served

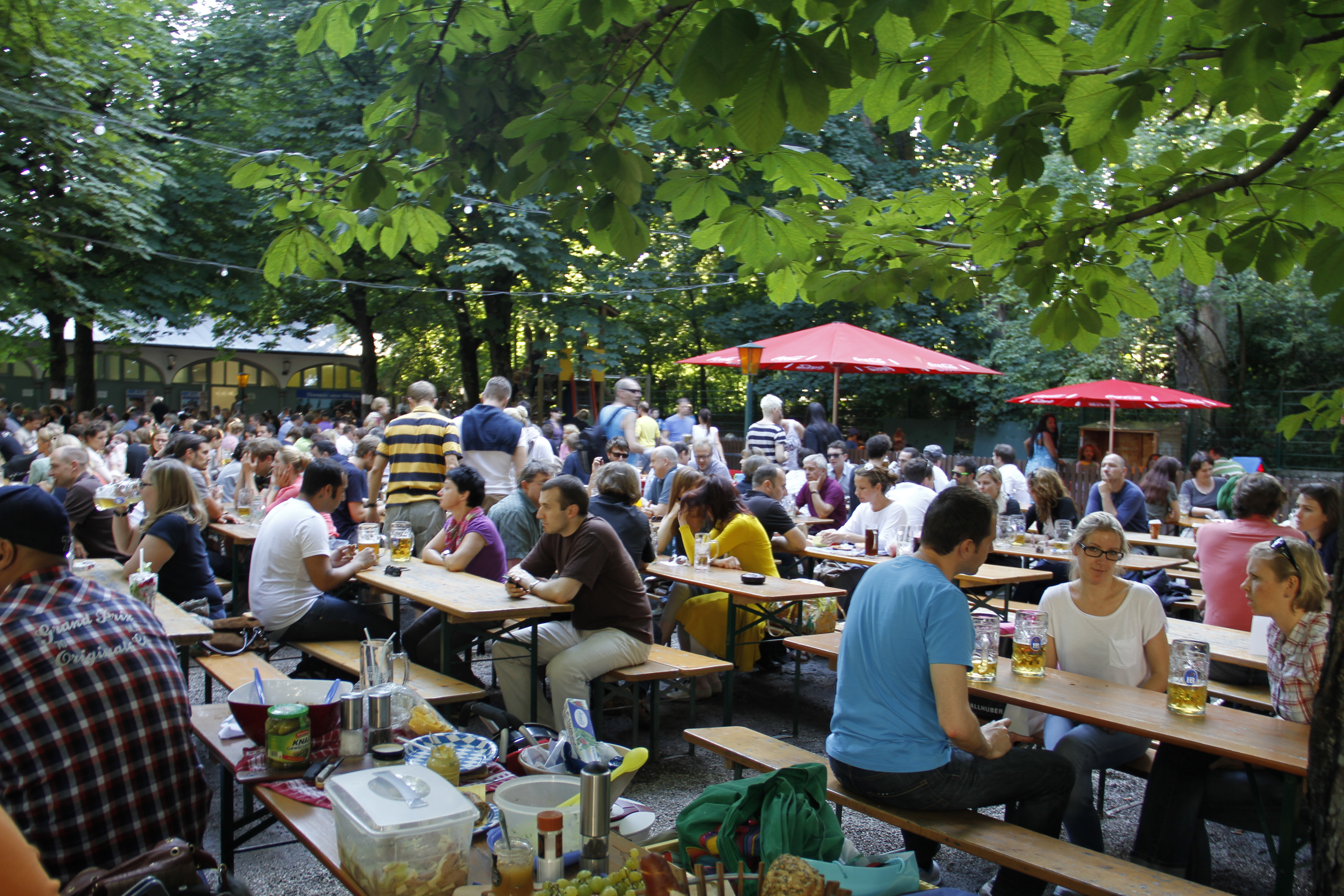
A typical Munich beer garden

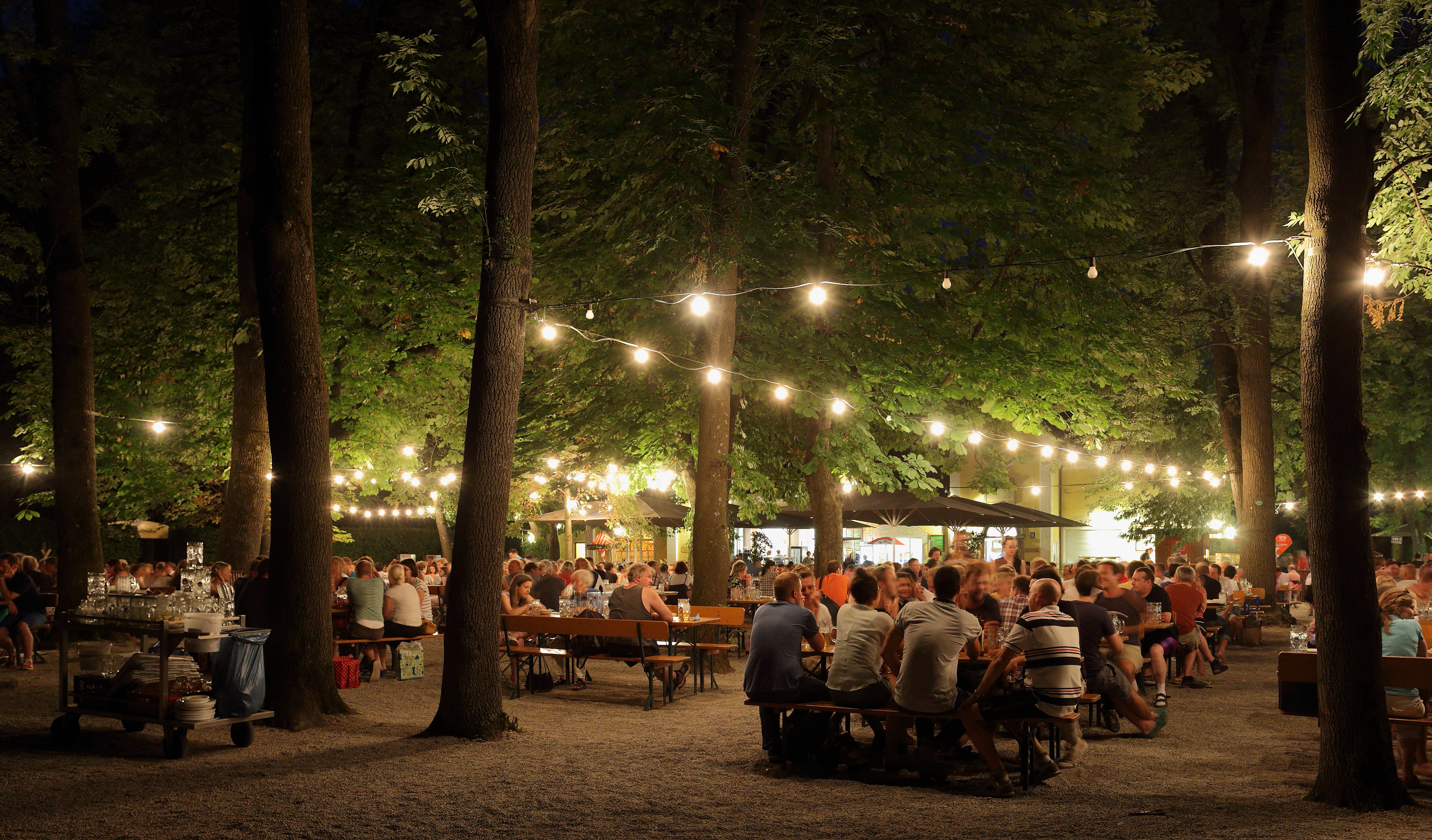
A beer garden at night

A beer garden (German: Biergarten) is an outdoor area in which beer and food are served, typically at shared tables shaded by trees.

Beer gardens originated in Bavaria, of which Munich is the capital city, in the 19th century, and remain common in Southern Germany. They are usually attached to a brewery, beer hall, pub, or restaurant.

== History ==
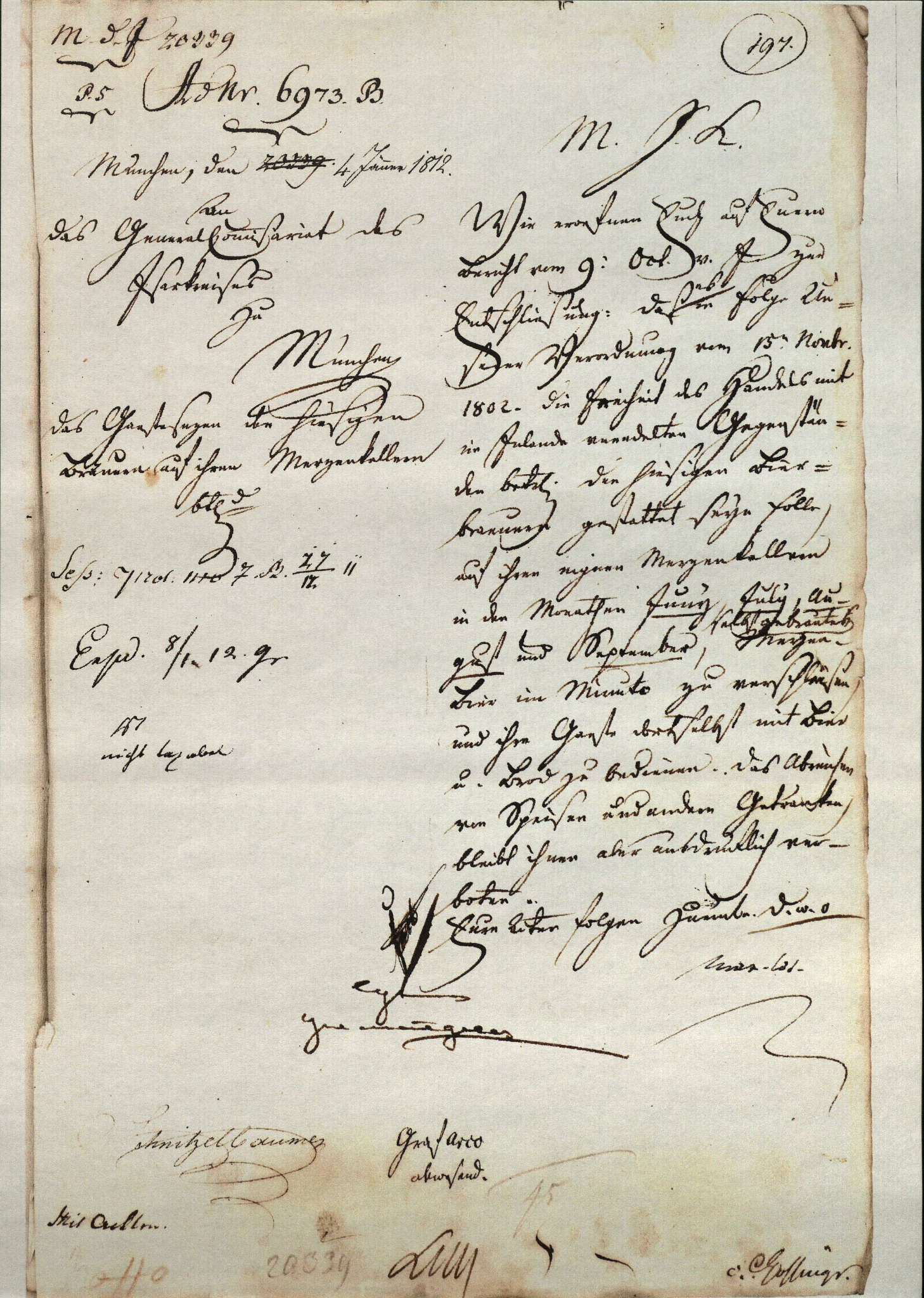
Decree by King Maximilian I Joseph of Bavaria, dated 4 January 1812, allowing Munich brewers to serve beer from their cooling cellars, but no food other than bread

Facilities of this kind existed for example in Bamberg since 1605 under the German term "Bierkeller" ("Beer cellars"). At that time, the Archdiocese of Bamberg was directly subordinated to Rome and not yet to the Duchy of Bavaria. Hence, the first "Biergarten" in the strict sense of the term and of the decree of 1812 by the Kingdom of Bavaria developed at the beginning of 19th century in Munich. While it is unknown which brewery was first, it was likely one of Munich's big six: Löwenbräu, Hofbräuhaus, Augustinerbräu, Paulaner, Hacker-Pschorr and Spaten.

Seasonal limitations on when beer could be brewed were already in the Bavarian brewing regulations by 1539. In 1553, Albert V decreed a period from 29 September, the Feast of St. Michael, to 23 April, the Feast of Saint George, for its production. The cool seasons were chosen to minimize the risk of fire when boiling mashed grain into wort. Numerous conflagrations had occurred, which resulted in the prohibition of brewing during the summer months. In response, large breweries dug cellars in the banks of the River Isar to keep their beer cool during storage. "Beer cellars" for consuming beer on premises naturally followed.

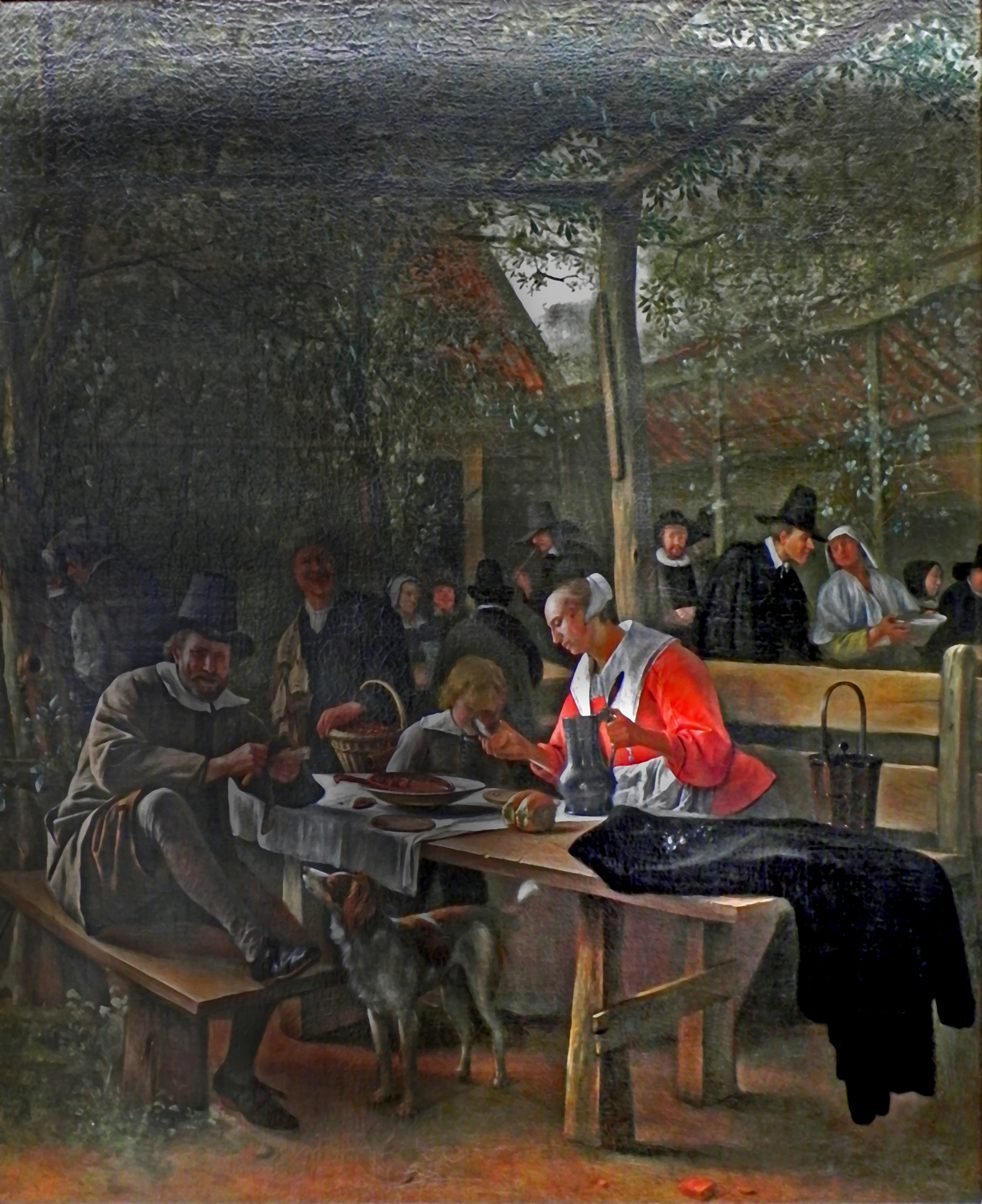
Tavern Garden. Painting by Jan Steen, c. 1660

To further reduce the cellar temperature during the warm seasons, 19th-century brewers layered gravel upon the cellars by the bluffs and planted horse-chestnut trees for their dense spreading canopies and shallow roots, which would not damage the cellars. Soon afterward, serving cool beer in a pleasant shaded setting emerged. Simple tables and benches were set up among the trees, creating the popular "beer garden" that is known today. Food service followed, aggrieving smaller breweries that found it difficult to compete, and they petitioned Maximilian I to forbid it. As a compromise, beer gardens allowed their patrons to bring their own food, which is still a common practice. Most beer gardens offer clothed tablesets, whose guests must buy food from the house. Those who bring their own food must use the bare table sets, unless—which is common—they bring their own cloth(s) also. With the advent of widespread lagering in the later 19th century, beer gardens grew more popular than ever.

Maximilian's decree is no longer in force, and many beer gardens forbid victuals not sold through the establishment. Common Bavarian fare such as Radi (radish), Brezn (soft pretzel), Obatzda (cheese dip), halbes Hendl (half a grilled chicken), Hax'n (knuckle of pork), and Steckerlfisch (grilled fish) are often served. Equally important to the beer garden is an atmosphere of Gemütlichkeit, conveying a feeling of warmth, friendliness, and belonging. Reinforced by shared tables, it is often accompanied by music, song, and fellowship among strangers.

That is so integral to beer garden culture that the Bayerische Biergartenverordnung (Bavarian Beer Garden Ordinance) of 1999 permits traditional tree shaded venues that allow their patrons to bring their own food to close later and exceed the noise limits that are otherwise in force. The term Biergarten is not otherwise restricted, and anyone can call any kind of open-air restaurant by that name, but purists distinguish between a Wirtsgarten, in which only the brewery's food is sold (such as the outdoor tables at the Hofbräuhaus am Platzl), and a Biergarten, in which patrons may bring their own.

== Around the world ==
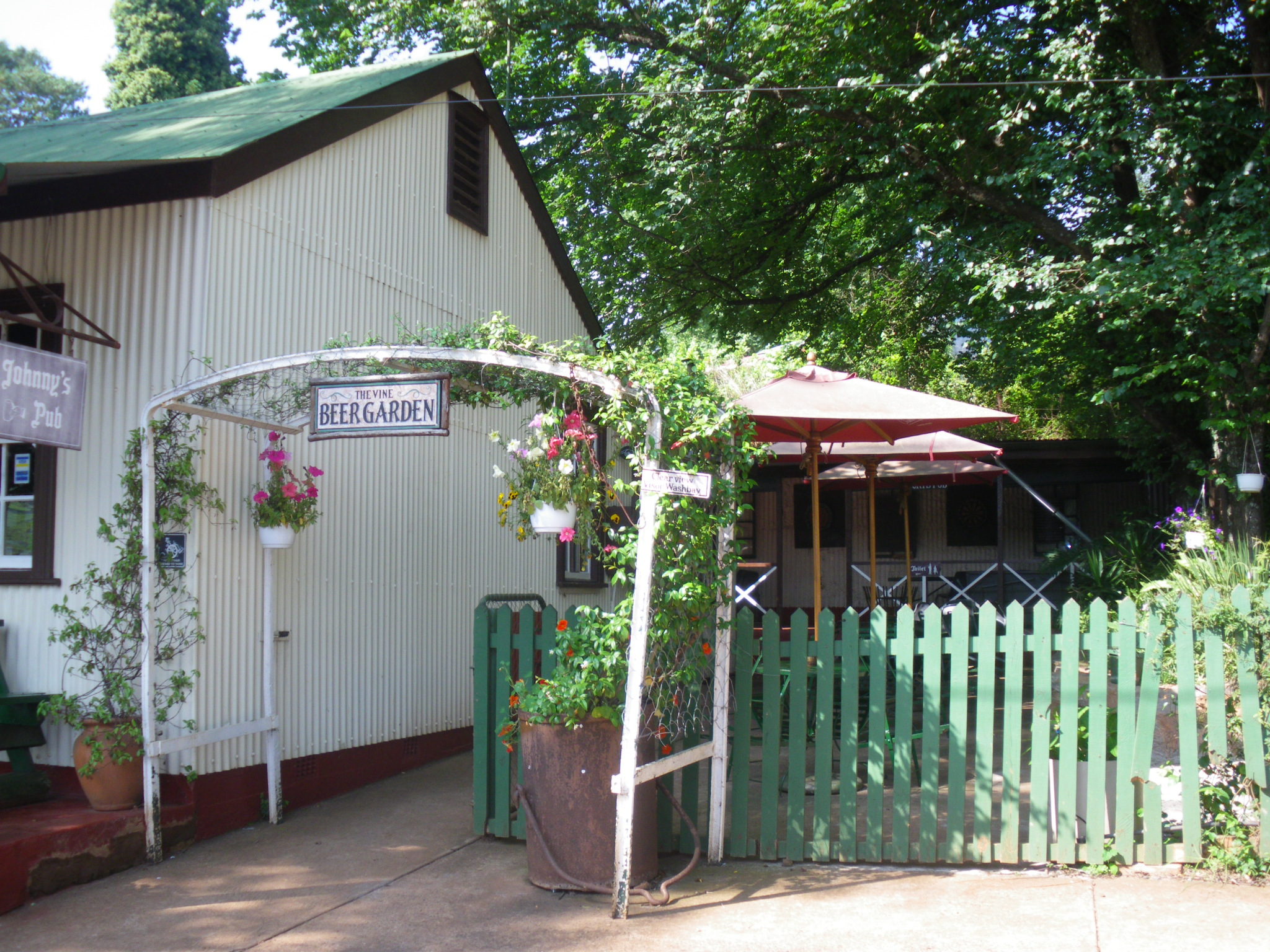
A beer garden in Pilgrim's Rest, South Africa

The term "beer garden" (Biergarten) has become a generic term for open-air establishments where beer is served. Many countries have such establishments. The characteristics of a traditional beer garden include trees, wooden benches, a gravel bed, and freshly prepared meals. Some modern beer gardens use plastic chairs, fast food, and other variations of the traditional beer garden.

The largest traditional beer garden in the world is the Hirschgarten in Munich, which seats 8,000.

=== Australia ===
Australia has many beer gardens, typically as part of a pub, or often next to sports fields.

=== Austria ===
In Austria, the beer garden is called Gastgarten (guest garden). They serve food such as ein Paar Würstel (a pair of the German Bratwurst) or Schweinebraten (German pot-roasted pork). When ordering beer, the choices are usually a Pfiff (0.2 L [0.044 imp gal; 0.053 US gal]), a Seidel (0.3 L [0.066 imp gal; 0.079 US gal]), or a Krügerl (0.5 L [0.11 imp gal; 0.13 US gal]).

=== Canada ===
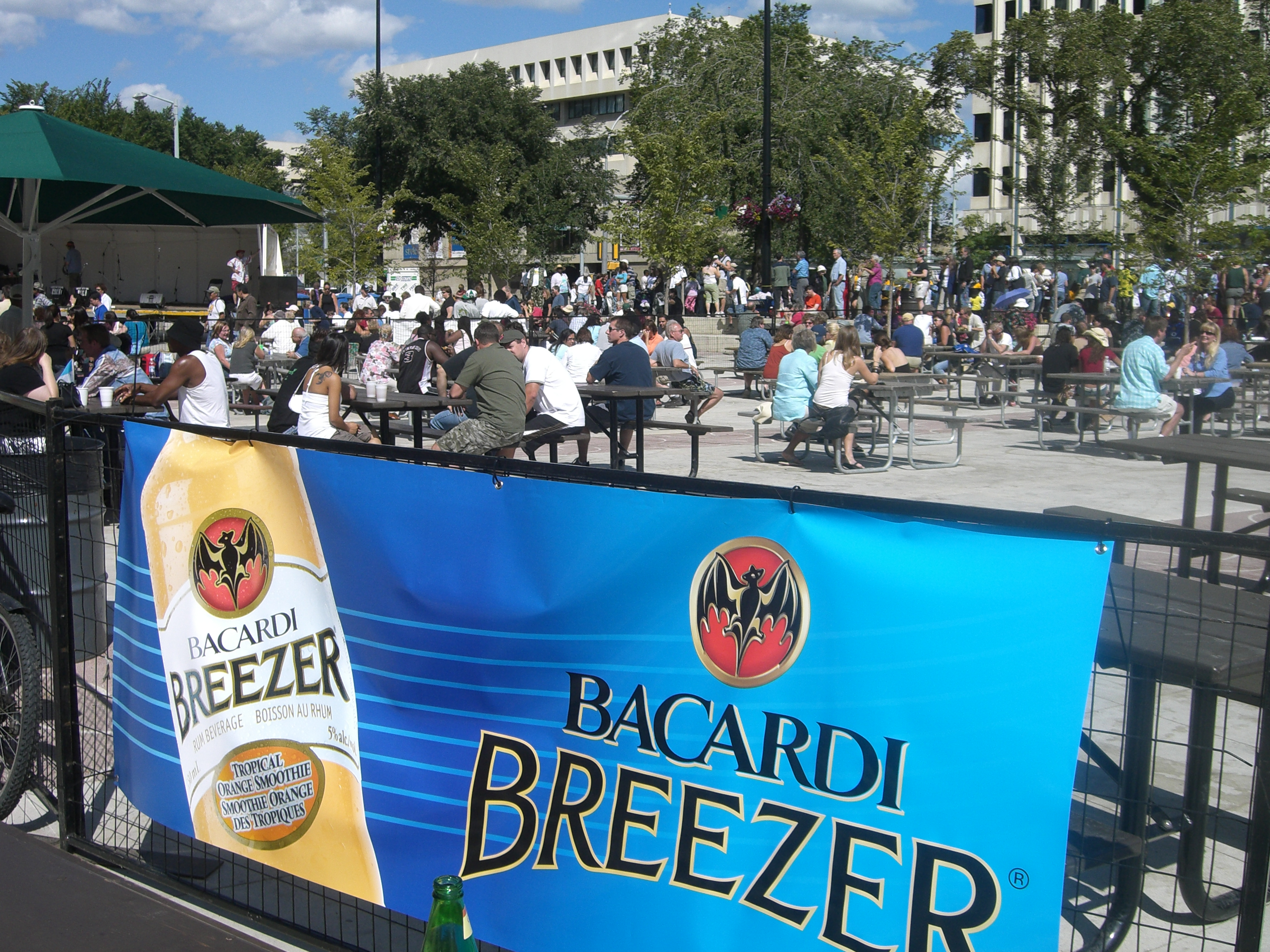
A beer garden in Churchill Square in Edmonton, Alberta, during the "Cariwest" Caribbean festival

Canada has traditionally lacked an outdoor eating culture conducive to beer gardens. Cold weather and biting insects are part of the reason. However, with increased urbanization during the 20th century, drinking at outdoor cafes and restaurant patios became more common. Such patios are usually attached to licensed establishments. They became particularly popular with smokers in the late 20th and early 21st century as smoking was prohibited in public indoor spaces, however as of 2026 such bans have been expanded in most jurisdictions to cover licensed patios as well.

Canadian alcohol laws generally forbid drinking in unlicensed public places, although in recent years such policies have been relaxed in some jurisdictions. In Canada, beer gardens are generally a segregated area attached to an event such as a concert or festival. They may be outdoors and/or indoors, depending on the season and other circumstances. Eligibility for the specific license needed to operate such an event varies by jurisdiction, and is often effectively limited to non-profit organizations.

Despite the name, most beer gardens in Canada today serve other alcoholic beverages as well. Beer gardens are very popular at large sporting events such as the Memorial Cup in hockey. It is usually illegal to remove alcohol from the area or bring in outside alcohol.

=== Germany ===
The words ‘beer garden’ derive from the German ‘Biergarten’, they are still a very common cultural aspect throughout Germany, where some of the world's oldest breweries are still active. The majority of towns and even villages have at least one small beer garden. Larger cities will have many throughout its neighbourhoods, including some of the largest beer gardens in the world. The Hirschgarten restaurant in Munich is noted for its beer garden, which is possibly the largest in the world. It has seating for well over 8,000 people. The restaurant dates back to 1791.

Biergartens typically are of a particular local or regional brewery, meaning they serve only the beers of the brewery they are associated with. The world's oldest brewery, Weihenstephaner (estd. 1040) has its beer garden next to its brewing facility and the Technical University of Munich, where a brewmaster degree is offered.

In 2011, the world record for 'The world's longest beer garden' was set in Berlin by the Berlin Beer Festival, measuring 1,820 m (5,970 ft) long.

=== Japan ===
Beer gardens are popular in Japan. Many are located on the roofs of department stores and hotels.

=== United Kingdom ===
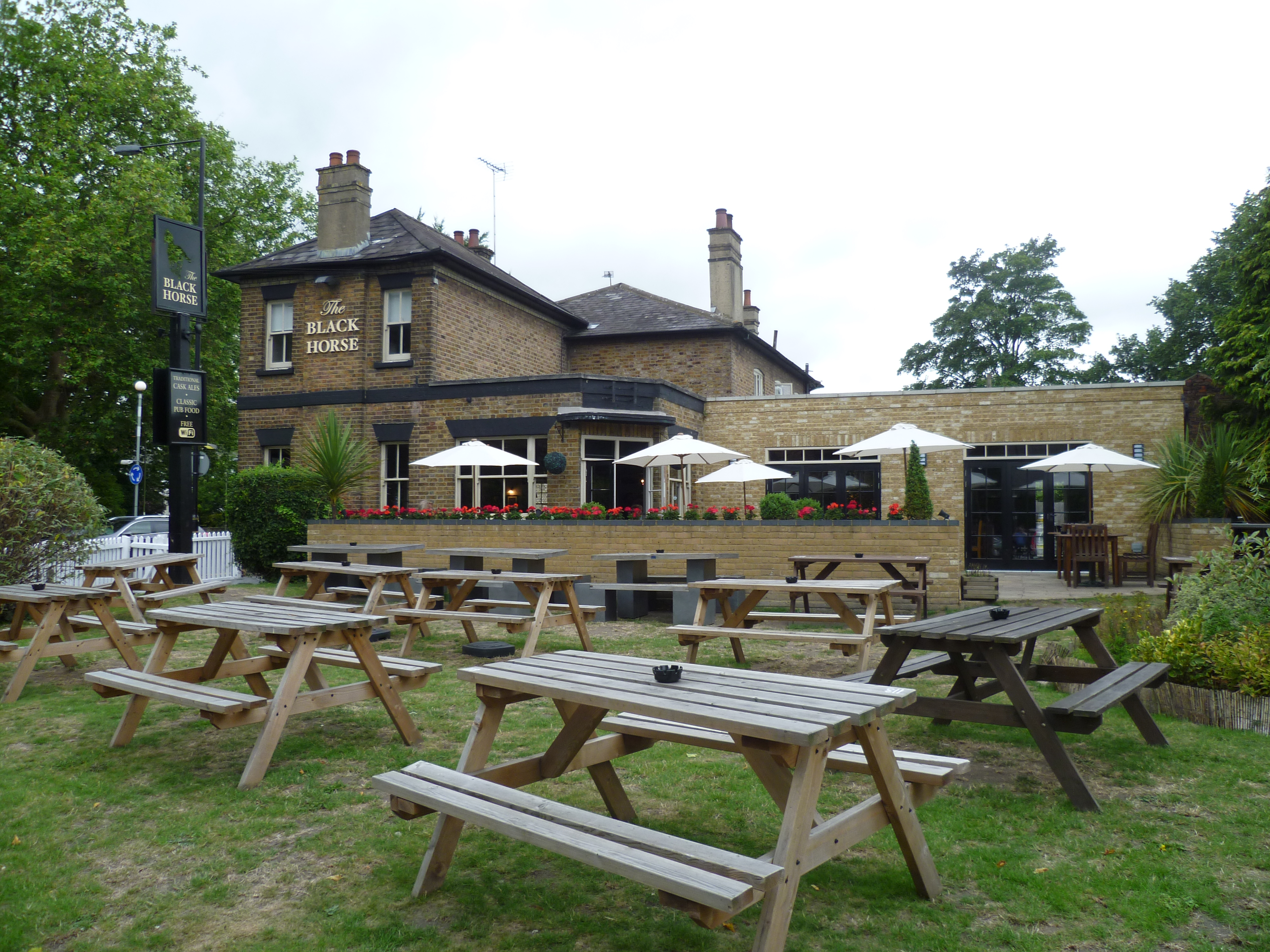
A beer garden in England

In Britain a beer garden is an open space which is attached to a pub. In the countryside they usually provide a surrounding view of the area; in towns and cities a beer garden is an open garden space. Pubs located along canals will usually have a canal-side beer garden. Many pubs compete throughout the year to be named 'Britain's best beer garden' in numerous awards. Some provide open air music, as well as food, beer and other drinks.

=== United States ===
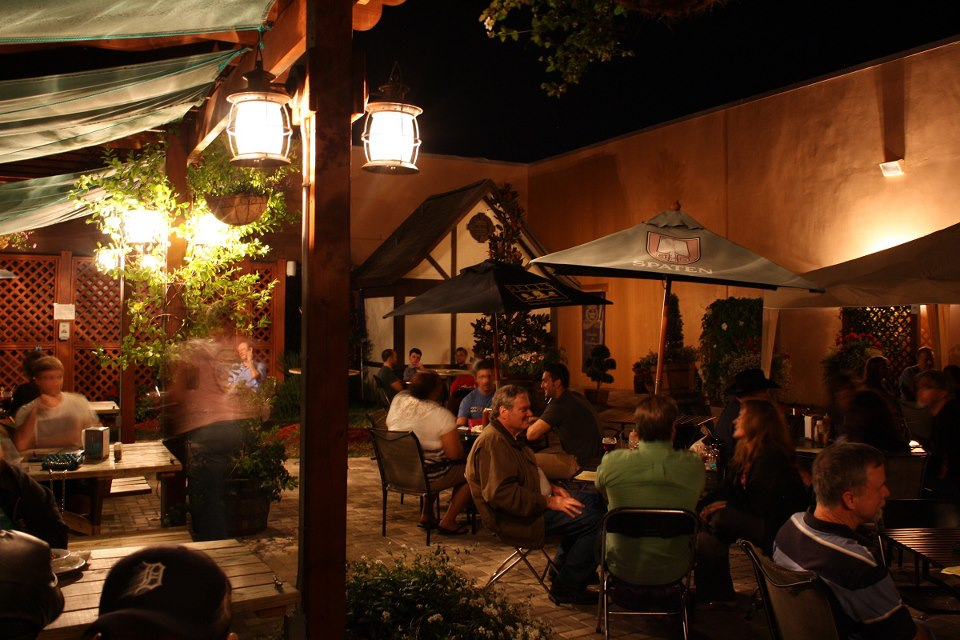
A beer garden at Coasters Pub, Indian Harbour Beach, Florida

In the United States, historically, beer gardens offered many pastimes besides just beer drinking. Some spots hosted shooting galleries, bowling alleys, and live classical music. People could come for entertainment and events, even if they did not want to partake in the drinking. Today, many beer gardens have outdoor games, as well as board games, available to patrons.

American liquor laws condition how beer gardens can operate in each state (legal drinking age is 21). For example, Washington alcohol laws require organizers to apply for and receive a liquor license, alcohol only to be consumed in the designated venue, the area to be fenced, and staff to "cut off" obviously drunk patrons. Additional laws restrict alcohol-related signage associated with the event and prevent smoking in the beer garden.

== See also ==
- Drinking culture
- Hofbräuhaus am Platzl
- Hofbräukeller
- List of public house topics
- Ratskeller
- Oktoberfest
- Schanigarten
- Sidewalk cafe
- Weihenstephaner
