= Marsfeld (Munich) =

Former military area in Munich, Germany

Coordinates: 48°08′47″N 11°32′54″E

Marsfeld is located in Maxvorstadt, Munich, Bavaria, Germany. It is a former military area and the site of the first railway station of the city.
