= Hackerbrücke =

Bridge in Munich, Germany

Coordinates: 48°8′30″N 11°32′54″E

Hackerbrücke

The Hackerbrücke (Hacker Bridge) is a road bridge across the main railway line in Munich immediately west of the city's central station. The name comes from the brewery Hacker-Pschorr, which was previously headquartered near the bridge.

The first bridge was built at the beginning of the 1870s. In 1890-94 this was replaced by a new bridge, constructed by the Maschinenfabrik Augsburg-Nürnberg ("Augsburg-Nuremberg machine factory"). It was partially destroyed during the second world war and restored in 1952–3. Six iron arches, 28.8 metres wide and eight metres high, carry the road; pairs of stone pillars support the arches. The bridge gives its name to the S-Bahn station Hackerbrücke, which is beneath the bridge and can only be accessed from it.
